

77001–77100 

|-bgcolor=#E9E9E9
| 77001 ||  || — || February 1, 2001 || Socorro || LINEAR || GER || align=right | 5.9 km || 
|-id=002 bgcolor=#fefefe
| 77002 ||  || — || February 1, 2001 || Socorro || LINEAR || — || align=right | 1.6 km || 
|-id=003 bgcolor=#fefefe
| 77003 ||  || — || February 1, 2001 || Socorro || LINEAR || — || align=right | 1.8 km || 
|-id=004 bgcolor=#fefefe
| 77004 ||  || — || February 1, 2001 || Socorro || LINEAR || — || align=right | 1.8 km || 
|-id=005 bgcolor=#fefefe
| 77005 ||  || — || February 1, 2001 || Socorro || LINEAR || — || align=right | 1.9 km || 
|-id=006 bgcolor=#fefefe
| 77006 ||  || — || February 1, 2001 || Socorro || LINEAR || V || align=right | 1.8 km || 
|-id=007 bgcolor=#fefefe
| 77007 ||  || — || February 1, 2001 || Socorro || LINEAR || — || align=right | 2.3 km || 
|-id=008 bgcolor=#fefefe
| 77008 ||  || — || February 1, 2001 || Socorro || LINEAR || — || align=right | 1.6 km || 
|-id=009 bgcolor=#E9E9E9
| 77009 ||  || — || February 1, 2001 || Socorro || LINEAR || — || align=right | 2.2 km || 
|-id=010 bgcolor=#E9E9E9
| 77010 ||  || — || February 1, 2001 || Socorro || LINEAR || — || align=right | 6.4 km || 
|-id=011 bgcolor=#fefefe
| 77011 ||  || — || February 1, 2001 || Socorro || LINEAR || V || align=right | 1.4 km || 
|-id=012 bgcolor=#fefefe
| 77012 ||  || — || February 1, 2001 || Socorro || LINEAR || — || align=right | 2.2 km || 
|-id=013 bgcolor=#fefefe
| 77013 ||  || — || February 1, 2001 || Socorro || LINEAR || — || align=right | 1.3 km || 
|-id=014 bgcolor=#fefefe
| 77014 ||  || — || February 1, 2001 || Socorro || LINEAR || — || align=right | 2.0 km || 
|-id=015 bgcolor=#fefefe
| 77015 ||  || — || February 1, 2001 || Socorro || LINEAR || — || align=right | 4.6 km || 
|-id=016 bgcolor=#fefefe
| 77016 ||  || — || February 1, 2001 || Socorro || LINEAR || — || align=right | 1.9 km || 
|-id=017 bgcolor=#fefefe
| 77017 ||  || — || February 1, 2001 || Socorro || LINEAR || PHO || align=right | 3.1 km || 
|-id=018 bgcolor=#fefefe
| 77018 ||  || — || February 1, 2001 || Socorro || LINEAR || SUL || align=right | 4.7 km || 
|-id=019 bgcolor=#fefefe
| 77019 ||  || — || February 1, 2001 || Socorro || LINEAR || NYS || align=right | 1.3 km || 
|-id=020 bgcolor=#E9E9E9
| 77020 ||  || — || February 1, 2001 || Socorro || LINEAR || — || align=right | 2.1 km || 
|-id=021 bgcolor=#fefefe
| 77021 ||  || — || February 1, 2001 || Socorro || LINEAR || NYS || align=right | 1.6 km || 
|-id=022 bgcolor=#fefefe
| 77022 ||  || — || February 1, 2001 || Socorro || LINEAR || — || align=right | 1.8 km || 
|-id=023 bgcolor=#fefefe
| 77023 ||  || — || February 2, 2001 || Socorro || LINEAR || — || align=right | 3.6 km || 
|-id=024 bgcolor=#fefefe
| 77024 ||  || — || February 1, 2001 || Anderson Mesa || LONEOS || V || align=right | 1.8 km || 
|-id=025 bgcolor=#fefefe
| 77025 ||  || — || February 1, 2001 || Anderson Mesa || LONEOS || V || align=right | 1.3 km || 
|-id=026 bgcolor=#fefefe
| 77026 ||  || — || February 1, 2001 || Anderson Mesa || LONEOS || — || align=right | 2.3 km || 
|-id=027 bgcolor=#fefefe
| 77027 ||  || — || February 1, 2001 || Socorro || LINEAR || — || align=right | 1.9 km || 
|-id=028 bgcolor=#E9E9E9
| 77028 ||  || — || February 2, 2001 || Anderson Mesa || LONEOS || EUN || align=right | 2.4 km || 
|-id=029 bgcolor=#fefefe
| 77029 ||  || — || February 2, 2001 || Anderson Mesa || LONEOS || FLO || align=right | 1.1 km || 
|-id=030 bgcolor=#fefefe
| 77030 ||  || — || February 2, 2001 || Anderson Mesa || LONEOS || V || align=right | 1.3 km || 
|-id=031 bgcolor=#E9E9E9
| 77031 ||  || — || February 2, 2001 || Anderson Mesa || LONEOS || — || align=right | 5.5 km || 
|-id=032 bgcolor=#fefefe
| 77032 ||  || — || February 2, 2001 || Anderson Mesa || LONEOS || — || align=right | 2.0 km || 
|-id=033 bgcolor=#fefefe
| 77033 ||  || — || February 2, 2001 || Anderson Mesa || LONEOS || — || align=right | 2.2 km || 
|-id=034 bgcolor=#fefefe
| 77034 ||  || — || February 5, 2001 || Socorro || LINEAR || — || align=right | 3.4 km || 
|-id=035 bgcolor=#E9E9E9
| 77035 ||  || — || February 13, 2001 || Socorro || LINEAR || MAR || align=right | 2.4 km || 
|-id=036 bgcolor=#fefefe
| 77036 ||  || — || February 14, 2001 || Višnjan Observatory || K. Korlević || — || align=right | 1.5 km || 
|-id=037 bgcolor=#E9E9E9
| 77037 ||  || — || February 15, 2001 || Oaxaca || J. M. Roe || — || align=right | 2.4 km || 
|-id=038 bgcolor=#fefefe
| 77038 ||  || — || February 15, 2001 || Oizumi || T. Kobayashi || — || align=right | 2.2 km || 
|-id=039 bgcolor=#fefefe
| 77039 ||  || — || February 15, 2001 || Kleť || Kleť Obs. || V || align=right | 1.3 km || 
|-id=040 bgcolor=#E9E9E9
| 77040 ||  || — || February 15, 2001 || Socorro || LINEAR || — || align=right | 2.5 km || 
|-id=041 bgcolor=#E9E9E9
| 77041 ||  || — || February 15, 2001 || Socorro || LINEAR || EUN || align=right | 2.6 km || 
|-id=042 bgcolor=#E9E9E9
| 77042 ||  || — || February 15, 2001 || Socorro || LINEAR || — || align=right | 3.0 km || 
|-id=043 bgcolor=#E9E9E9
| 77043 ||  || — || February 15, 2001 || Črni Vrh || Črni Vrh || — || align=right | 2.4 km || 
|-id=044 bgcolor=#E9E9E9
| 77044 Galera-Rosillo ||  ||  || February 15, 2001 || La Palma || La Palma Obs. || MAR || align=right | 2.3 km || 
|-id=045 bgcolor=#d6d6d6
| 77045 ||  || — || February 15, 2001 || Socorro || LINEAR || — || align=right | 7.6 km || 
|-id=046 bgcolor=#fefefe
| 77046 ||  || — || February 3, 2001 || Socorro || LINEAR || — || align=right | 3.5 km || 
|-id=047 bgcolor=#fefefe
| 77047 ||  || — || February 15, 2001 || Socorro || LINEAR || — || align=right | 3.6 km || 
|-id=048 bgcolor=#fefefe
| 77048 ||  || — || February 12, 2001 || Anderson Mesa || LONEOS || — || align=right | 2.2 km || 
|-id=049 bgcolor=#fefefe
| 77049 ||  || — || February 1, 2001 || Cima Ekar || ADAS || — || align=right | 1.4 km || 
|-id=050 bgcolor=#fefefe
| 77050 || 2001 DB || — || February 16, 2001 || Črni Vrh || Črni Vrh || FLO || align=right | 1.6 km || 
|-id=051 bgcolor=#fefefe
| 77051 || 2001 DL || — || February 16, 2001 || Desert Beaver || W. K. Y. Yeung || NYS || align=right | 1.5 km || 
|-id=052 bgcolor=#fefefe
| 77052 ||  || — || February 16, 2001 || Kitt Peak || Spacewatch || — || align=right | 1.7 km || 
|-id=053 bgcolor=#fefefe
| 77053 ||  || — || February 16, 2001 || Višnjan Observatory || K. Korlević || — || align=right | 1.8 km || 
|-id=054 bgcolor=#fefefe
| 77054 ||  || — || February 16, 2001 || Oizumi || T. Kobayashi || — || align=right | 2.0 km || 
|-id=055 bgcolor=#fefefe
| 77055 ||  || — || February 17, 2001 || Socorro || LINEAR || V || align=right | 1.4 km || 
|-id=056 bgcolor=#E9E9E9
| 77056 ||  || — || February 17, 2001 || Socorro || LINEAR || MAR || align=right | 2.5 km || 
|-id=057 bgcolor=#E9E9E9
| 77057 ||  || — || February 17, 2001 || Socorro || LINEAR || — || align=right | 3.2 km || 
|-id=058 bgcolor=#fefefe
| 77058 ||  || — || February 17, 2001 || Socorro || LINEAR || NYS || align=right | 1.5 km || 
|-id=059 bgcolor=#fefefe
| 77059 ||  || — || February 20, 2001 || Oaxaca || J. M. Roe || — || align=right | 2.1 km || 
|-id=060 bgcolor=#fefefe
| 77060 ||  || — || February 16, 2001 || Socorro || LINEAR || FLO || align=right | 1.2 km || 
|-id=061 bgcolor=#fefefe
| 77061 ||  || — || February 16, 2001 || Socorro || LINEAR || V || align=right | 1.8 km || 
|-id=062 bgcolor=#fefefe
| 77062 ||  || — || February 16, 2001 || Socorro || LINEAR || ERI || align=right | 3.9 km || 
|-id=063 bgcolor=#fefefe
| 77063 ||  || — || February 16, 2001 || Socorro || LINEAR || V || align=right | 1.2 km || 
|-id=064 bgcolor=#fefefe
| 77064 ||  || — || February 16, 2001 || Socorro || LINEAR || — || align=right | 4.7 km || 
|-id=065 bgcolor=#E9E9E9
| 77065 ||  || — || February 16, 2001 || Socorro || LINEAR || INO || align=right | 3.2 km || 
|-id=066 bgcolor=#E9E9E9
| 77066 ||  || — || February 16, 2001 || Socorro || LINEAR || — || align=right | 3.7 km || 
|-id=067 bgcolor=#fefefe
| 77067 ||  || — || February 16, 2001 || Socorro || LINEAR || V || align=right | 1.7 km || 
|-id=068 bgcolor=#E9E9E9
| 77068 ||  || — || February 16, 2001 || Socorro || LINEAR || — || align=right | 4.5 km || 
|-id=069 bgcolor=#E9E9E9
| 77069 ||  || — || February 16, 2001 || Socorro || LINEAR || — || align=right | 3.8 km || 
|-id=070 bgcolor=#fefefe
| 77070 ||  || — || February 16, 2001 || Socorro || LINEAR || — || align=right | 1.8 km || 
|-id=071 bgcolor=#fefefe
| 77071 ||  || — || February 16, 2001 || Socorro || LINEAR || — || align=right | 1.8 km || 
|-id=072 bgcolor=#E9E9E9
| 77072 ||  || — || February 17, 2001 || Socorro || LINEAR || — || align=right | 3.9 km || 
|-id=073 bgcolor=#fefefe
| 77073 ||  || — || February 17, 2001 || Socorro || LINEAR || FLO || align=right | 1.3 km || 
|-id=074 bgcolor=#E9E9E9
| 77074 ||  || — || February 17, 2001 || Socorro || LINEAR || — || align=right | 2.2 km || 
|-id=075 bgcolor=#E9E9E9
| 77075 ||  || — || February 17, 2001 || Socorro || LINEAR || — || align=right | 2.2 km || 
|-id=076 bgcolor=#E9E9E9
| 77076 ||  || — || February 17, 2001 || Socorro || LINEAR || — || align=right | 3.2 km || 
|-id=077 bgcolor=#E9E9E9
| 77077 ||  || — || February 17, 2001 || Socorro || LINEAR || — || align=right | 2.7 km || 
|-id=078 bgcolor=#fefefe
| 77078 ||  || — || February 17, 2001 || Socorro || LINEAR || — || align=right | 1.4 km || 
|-id=079 bgcolor=#E9E9E9
| 77079 ||  || — || February 17, 2001 || Socorro || LINEAR || — || align=right | 2.3 km || 
|-id=080 bgcolor=#E9E9E9
| 77080 ||  || — || February 17, 2001 || Socorro || LINEAR || — || align=right | 2.7 km || 
|-id=081 bgcolor=#fefefe
| 77081 ||  || — || February 17, 2001 || Socorro || LINEAR || V || align=right | 1.5 km || 
|-id=082 bgcolor=#fefefe
| 77082 ||  || — || February 17, 2001 || Socorro || LINEAR || NYS || align=right | 1.9 km || 
|-id=083 bgcolor=#fefefe
| 77083 ||  || — || February 19, 2001 || Socorro || LINEAR || SUL || align=right | 4.6 km || 
|-id=084 bgcolor=#fefefe
| 77084 ||  || — || February 19, 2001 || Socorro || LINEAR || — || align=right | 1.6 km || 
|-id=085 bgcolor=#fefefe
| 77085 ||  || — || February 19, 2001 || Socorro || LINEAR || V || align=right | 1.3 km || 
|-id=086 bgcolor=#fefefe
| 77086 ||  || — || February 19, 2001 || Socorro || LINEAR || FLO || align=right | 1.8 km || 
|-id=087 bgcolor=#E9E9E9
| 77087 ||  || — || February 19, 2001 || Socorro || LINEAR || — || align=right | 2.9 km || 
|-id=088 bgcolor=#fefefe
| 77088 ||  || — || February 19, 2001 || Socorro || LINEAR || V || align=right | 1.5 km || 
|-id=089 bgcolor=#d6d6d6
| 77089 ||  || — || February 19, 2001 || Socorro || LINEAR || HYG || align=right | 6.1 km || 
|-id=090 bgcolor=#fefefe
| 77090 ||  || — || February 19, 2001 || Socorro || LINEAR || — || align=right | 1.5 km || 
|-id=091 bgcolor=#fefefe
| 77091 ||  || — || February 19, 2001 || Socorro || LINEAR || NYS || align=right | 1.5 km || 
|-id=092 bgcolor=#fefefe
| 77092 ||  || — || February 19, 2001 || Socorro || LINEAR || ERI || align=right | 3.5 km || 
|-id=093 bgcolor=#fefefe
| 77093 ||  || — || February 20, 2001 || Haleakala || NEAT || FLO || align=right | 1.2 km || 
|-id=094 bgcolor=#fefefe
| 77094 ||  || — || February 16, 2001 || Socorro || LINEAR || V || align=right | 1.3 km || 
|-id=095 bgcolor=#E9E9E9
| 77095 ||  || — || February 16, 2001 || Socorro || LINEAR || — || align=right | 1.6 km || 
|-id=096 bgcolor=#fefefe
| 77096 ||  || — || February 16, 2001 || Socorro || LINEAR || FLO || align=right | 1.6 km || 
|-id=097 bgcolor=#fefefe
| 77097 ||  || — || February 17, 2001 || Socorro || LINEAR || — || align=right | 1.6 km || 
|-id=098 bgcolor=#E9E9E9
| 77098 ||  || — || February 16, 2001 || Kitt Peak || Spacewatch || — || align=right | 1.9 km || 
|-id=099 bgcolor=#fefefe
| 77099 ||  || — || February 19, 2001 || Socorro || LINEAR || — || align=right | 2.0 km || 
|-id=100 bgcolor=#fefefe
| 77100 ||  || — || February 19, 2001 || Socorro || LINEAR || NYS || align=right | 3.0 km || 
|}

77101–77200 

|-bgcolor=#fefefe
| 77101 ||  || — || February 19, 2001 || Socorro || LINEAR || — || align=right | 1.6 km || 
|-id=102 bgcolor=#fefefe
| 77102 ||  || — || February 19, 2001 || Socorro || LINEAR || — || align=right | 1.8 km || 
|-id=103 bgcolor=#fefefe
| 77103 ||  || — || February 19, 2001 || Socorro || LINEAR || NYS || align=right | 1.4 km || 
|-id=104 bgcolor=#fefefe
| 77104 ||  || — || February 19, 2001 || Socorro || LINEAR || NYS || align=right | 1.3 km || 
|-id=105 bgcolor=#fefefe
| 77105 ||  || — || February 19, 2001 || Socorro || LINEAR || — || align=right | 1.6 km || 
|-id=106 bgcolor=#fefefe
| 77106 ||  || — || February 19, 2001 || Socorro || LINEAR || NYS || align=right | 1.5 km || 
|-id=107 bgcolor=#fefefe
| 77107 ||  || — || February 19, 2001 || Socorro || LINEAR || MAS || align=right | 1.6 km || 
|-id=108 bgcolor=#fefefe
| 77108 ||  || — || February 19, 2001 || Socorro || LINEAR || EUT || align=right | 1.4 km || 
|-id=109 bgcolor=#fefefe
| 77109 ||  || — || February 19, 2001 || Socorro || LINEAR || — || align=right | 3.7 km || 
|-id=110 bgcolor=#E9E9E9
| 77110 ||  || — || February 19, 2001 || Socorro || LINEAR || — || align=right | 3.0 km || 
|-id=111 bgcolor=#fefefe
| 77111 ||  || — || February 19, 2001 || Socorro || LINEAR || FLO || align=right | 1.2 km || 
|-id=112 bgcolor=#E9E9E9
| 77112 ||  || — || February 19, 2001 || Socorro || LINEAR || EUN || align=right | 4.2 km || 
|-id=113 bgcolor=#fefefe
| 77113 ||  || — || February 19, 2001 || Socorro || LINEAR || CIM || align=right | 7.8 km || 
|-id=114 bgcolor=#fefefe
| 77114 ||  || — || February 20, 2001 || Socorro || LINEAR || — || align=right | 1.3 km || 
|-id=115 bgcolor=#fefefe
| 77115 ||  || — || February 20, 2001 || Socorro || LINEAR || — || align=right | 1.5 km || 
|-id=116 bgcolor=#fefefe
| 77116 ||  || — || February 20, 2001 || Socorro || LINEAR || NYS || align=right data-sort-value="0.97" | 970 m || 
|-id=117 bgcolor=#E9E9E9
| 77117 ||  || — || February 20, 2001 || Socorro || LINEAR || — || align=right | 2.5 km || 
|-id=118 bgcolor=#E9E9E9
| 77118 ||  || — || February 16, 2001 || Socorro || LINEAR || — || align=right | 2.6 km || 
|-id=119 bgcolor=#fefefe
| 77119 ||  || — || February 26, 2001 || Oizumi || T. Kobayashi || — || align=right | 2.6 km || 
|-id=120 bgcolor=#fefefe
| 77120 ||  || — || February 26, 2001 || Oizumi || T. Kobayashi || V || align=right | 1.8 km || 
|-id=121 bgcolor=#fefefe
| 77121 ||  || — || February 24, 2001 || Haleakala || NEAT || — || align=right | 2.5 km || 
|-id=122 bgcolor=#fefefe
| 77122 ||  || — || February 24, 2001 || Haleakala || NEAT || V || align=right | 1.8 km || 
|-id=123 bgcolor=#E9E9E9
| 77123 ||  || — || February 27, 2001 || Kitt Peak || Spacewatch || — || align=right | 2.6 km || 
|-id=124 bgcolor=#fefefe
| 77124 ||  || — || February 27, 2001 || Kitt Peak || Spacewatch || MAS || align=right | 1.2 km || 
|-id=125 bgcolor=#d6d6d6
| 77125 ||  || — || February 27, 2001 || Kitt Peak || Spacewatch || — || align=right | 4.1 km || 
|-id=126 bgcolor=#fefefe
| 77126 ||  || — || February 21, 2001 || Kitt Peak || Spacewatch || MAS || align=right | 1.6 km || 
|-id=127 bgcolor=#fefefe
| 77127 ||  || — || February 19, 2001 || Socorro || LINEAR || PHO || align=right | 2.7 km || 
|-id=128 bgcolor=#E9E9E9
| 77128 ||  || — || February 19, 2001 || Haleakala || NEAT || MAR || align=right | 3.3 km || 
|-id=129 bgcolor=#fefefe
| 77129 ||  || — || February 17, 2001 || Socorro || LINEAR || — || align=right | 1.8 km || 
|-id=130 bgcolor=#fefefe
| 77130 ||  || — || February 17, 2001 || Socorro || LINEAR || — || align=right | 2.2 km || 
|-id=131 bgcolor=#fefefe
| 77131 ||  || — || February 17, 2001 || Socorro || LINEAR || V || align=right | 1.2 km || 
|-id=132 bgcolor=#fefefe
| 77132 ||  || — || February 16, 2001 || Socorro || LINEAR || V || align=right | 1.6 km || 
|-id=133 bgcolor=#d6d6d6
| 77133 ||  || — || February 16, 2001 || Socorro || LINEAR || BRA || align=right | 3.6 km || 
|-id=134 bgcolor=#fefefe
| 77134 ||  || — || February 16, 2001 || Kitt Peak || Spacewatch || — || align=right | 1.7 km || 
|-id=135 bgcolor=#fefefe
| 77135 ||  || — || February 16, 2001 || Anderson Mesa || LONEOS || — || align=right | 1.9 km || 
|-id=136 bgcolor=#fefefe
| 77136 Mendillo ||  ||  || February 26, 2001 || Cima Ekar || ADAS || V || align=right | 1.5 km || 
|-id=137 bgcolor=#E9E9E9
| 77137 ||  || — || February 20, 2001 || Kitt Peak || Spacewatch || — || align=right | 3.2 km || 
|-id=138 bgcolor=#fefefe
| 77138 Puiching || 2001 EN ||  || March 2, 2001 || Desert Beaver || W. K. Y. Yeung || NYS || align=right | 1.6 km || 
|-id=139 bgcolor=#E9E9E9
| 77139 || 2001 EY || — || March 1, 2001 || Socorro || LINEAR || — || align=right | 6.5 km || 
|-id=140 bgcolor=#fefefe
| 77140 ||  || — || March 1, 2001 || Socorro || LINEAR || — || align=right | 1.8 km || 
|-id=141 bgcolor=#fefefe
| 77141 ||  || — || March 1, 2001 || Socorro || LINEAR || — || align=right | 1.5 km || 
|-id=142 bgcolor=#fefefe
| 77142 ||  || — || March 1, 2001 || Socorro || LINEAR || — || align=right | 2.0 km || 
|-id=143 bgcolor=#fefefe
| 77143 ||  || — || March 2, 2001 || Anderson Mesa || LONEOS || — || align=right | 1.3 km || 
|-id=144 bgcolor=#E9E9E9
| 77144 ||  || — || March 2, 2001 || Anderson Mesa || LONEOS || MAR || align=right | 2.3 km || 
|-id=145 bgcolor=#fefefe
| 77145 ||  || — || March 2, 2001 || Anderson Mesa || LONEOS || NYS || align=right | 1.5 km || 
|-id=146 bgcolor=#fefefe
| 77146 ||  || — || March 2, 2001 || Anderson Mesa || LONEOS || — || align=right | 1.8 km || 
|-id=147 bgcolor=#fefefe
| 77147 ||  || — || March 2, 2001 || Anderson Mesa || LONEOS || FLO || align=right | 1.6 km || 
|-id=148 bgcolor=#fefefe
| 77148 ||  || — || March 2, 2001 || Anderson Mesa || LONEOS || — || align=right | 1.8 km || 
|-id=149 bgcolor=#fefefe
| 77149 ||  || — || March 2, 2001 || Anderson Mesa || LONEOS || — || align=right | 3.1 km || 
|-id=150 bgcolor=#fefefe
| 77150 ||  || — || March 2, 2001 || Anderson Mesa || LONEOS || — || align=right | 2.2 km || 
|-id=151 bgcolor=#fefefe
| 77151 ||  || — || March 2, 2001 || Anderson Mesa || LONEOS || — || align=right | 3.4 km || 
|-id=152 bgcolor=#fefefe
| 77152 ||  || — || March 2, 2001 || Anderson Mesa || LONEOS || NYS || align=right | 1.5 km || 
|-id=153 bgcolor=#fefefe
| 77153 ||  || — || March 2, 2001 || Anderson Mesa || LONEOS || NYS || align=right | 1.2 km || 
|-id=154 bgcolor=#fefefe
| 77154 ||  || — || March 2, 2001 || Anderson Mesa || LONEOS || — || align=right | 1.2 km || 
|-id=155 bgcolor=#d6d6d6
| 77155 ||  || — || March 2, 2001 || Desert Beaver || W. K. Y. Yeung || — || align=right | 7.1 km || 
|-id=156 bgcolor=#fefefe
| 77156 ||  || — || March 2, 2001 || Haleakala || NEAT || — || align=right | 2.2 km || 
|-id=157 bgcolor=#E9E9E9
| 77157 ||  || — || March 2, 2001 || Haleakala || NEAT || — || align=right | 3.4 km || 
|-id=158 bgcolor=#d6d6d6
| 77158 ||  || — || March 15, 2001 || Prescott || P. G. Comba || LIX || align=right | 8.7 km || 
|-id=159 bgcolor=#fefefe
| 77159 ||  || — || March 15, 2001 || Marxuquera || Marxuquera Obs. || FLO || align=right | 3.9 km || 
|-id=160 bgcolor=#fefefe
| 77160 ||  || — || March 13, 2001 || Haleakala || NEAT || — || align=right | 2.1 km || 
|-id=161 bgcolor=#fefefe
| 77161 ||  || — || March 14, 2001 || Haleakala || NEAT || — || align=right | 1.4 km || 
|-id=162 bgcolor=#fefefe
| 77162 ||  || — || March 15, 2001 || Anderson Mesa || LONEOS || FLO || align=right | 1.5 km || 
|-id=163 bgcolor=#E9E9E9
| 77163 ||  || — || March 15, 2001 || Anderson Mesa || LONEOS || — || align=right | 2.9 km || 
|-id=164 bgcolor=#E9E9E9
| 77164 ||  || — || March 15, 2001 || Anderson Mesa || LONEOS || EUN || align=right | 2.3 km || 
|-id=165 bgcolor=#E9E9E9
| 77165 ||  || — || March 15, 2001 || Anderson Mesa || LONEOS || — || align=right | 5.9 km || 
|-id=166 bgcolor=#d6d6d6
| 77166 ||  || — || March 15, 2001 || Needville || Needville Obs. || — || align=right | 5.7 km || 
|-id=167 bgcolor=#E9E9E9
| 77167 ||  || — || March 15, 2001 || Anderson Mesa || LONEOS || MRX || align=right | 2.3 km || 
|-id=168 bgcolor=#fefefe
| 77168 ||  || — || March 15, 2001 || Anderson Mesa || LONEOS || V || align=right | 1.6 km || 
|-id=169 bgcolor=#fefefe
| 77169 ||  || — || March 15, 2001 || Kitt Peak || Spacewatch || — || align=right | 1.8 km || 
|-id=170 bgcolor=#fefefe
| 77170 ||  || — || March 15, 2001 || Haleakala || NEAT || — || align=right | 1.7 km || 
|-id=171 bgcolor=#E9E9E9
| 77171 ||  || — || March 4, 2001 || Socorro || LINEAR || — || align=right | 2.5 km || 
|-id=172 bgcolor=#E9E9E9
| 77172 ||  || — || March 14, 2001 || Anderson Mesa || LONEOS || EUN || align=right | 3.1 km || 
|-id=173 bgcolor=#fefefe
| 77173 ||  || — || March 2, 2001 || Anderson Mesa || LONEOS || NYS || align=right | 1.6 km || 
|-id=174 bgcolor=#fefefe
| 77174 || 2001 FW || — || March 17, 2001 || Socorro || LINEAR || — || align=right | 1.6 km || 
|-id=175 bgcolor=#fefefe
| 77175 ||  || — || March 19, 2001 || Reedy Creek || J. Broughton || NYS || align=right | 1.4 km || 
|-id=176 bgcolor=#fefefe
| 77176 ||  || — || March 16, 2001 || Socorro || LINEAR || — || align=right | 1.6 km || 
|-id=177 bgcolor=#E9E9E9
| 77177 ||  || — || March 16, 2001 || Socorro || LINEAR || — || align=right | 3.1 km || 
|-id=178 bgcolor=#fefefe
| 77178 ||  || — || March 18, 2001 || Socorro || LINEAR || — || align=right | 2.1 km || 
|-id=179 bgcolor=#d6d6d6
| 77179 ||  || — || March 19, 2001 || Prescott || P. G. Comba || — || align=right | 5.9 km || 
|-id=180 bgcolor=#fefefe
| 77180 ||  || — || March 19, 2001 || Socorro || LINEAR || NYS || align=right | 2.1 km || 
|-id=181 bgcolor=#E9E9E9
| 77181 ||  || — || March 16, 2001 || Needville || Needville Obs. || — || align=right | 2.3 km || 
|-id=182 bgcolor=#fefefe
| 77182 ||  || — || March 18, 2001 || Socorro || LINEAR || FLO || align=right | 2.0 km || 
|-id=183 bgcolor=#E9E9E9
| 77183 ||  || — || March 18, 2001 || Socorro || LINEAR || — || align=right | 3.4 km || 
|-id=184 bgcolor=#E9E9E9
| 77184 ||  || — || March 20, 2001 || Haleakala || NEAT || ADE || align=right | 4.9 km || 
|-id=185 bgcolor=#E9E9E9
| 77185 Cherryh ||  ||  || March 20, 2001 || Needville || D. Wells, A. Cruz || — || align=right | 4.0 km || 
|-id=186 bgcolor=#fefefe
| 77186 ||  || — || March 20, 2001 || Reedy Creek || J. Broughton || V || align=right | 1.9 km || 
|-id=187 bgcolor=#fefefe
| 77187 ||  || — || March 22, 2001 || Kvistaberg || UDAS || — || align=right | 1.7 km || 
|-id=188 bgcolor=#E9E9E9
| 77188 ||  || — || March 22, 2001 || Kvistaberg || UDAS || MAR || align=right | 2.9 km || 
|-id=189 bgcolor=#fefefe
| 77189 ||  || — || March 19, 2001 || Anderson Mesa || LONEOS || — || align=right | 1.6 km || 
|-id=190 bgcolor=#E9E9E9
| 77190 ||  || — || March 19, 2001 || Anderson Mesa || LONEOS || — || align=right | 3.2 km || 
|-id=191 bgcolor=#fefefe
| 77191 ||  || — || March 19, 2001 || Anderson Mesa || LONEOS || V || align=right | 1.5 km || 
|-id=192 bgcolor=#fefefe
| 77192 ||  || — || March 19, 2001 || Anderson Mesa || LONEOS || — || align=right | 2.6 km || 
|-id=193 bgcolor=#fefefe
| 77193 ||  || — || March 19, 2001 || Anderson Mesa || LONEOS || — || align=right | 1.2 km || 
|-id=194 bgcolor=#d6d6d6
| 77194 ||  || — || March 19, 2001 || Anderson Mesa || LONEOS || — || align=right | 5.3 km || 
|-id=195 bgcolor=#E9E9E9
| 77195 ||  || — || March 19, 2001 || Anderson Mesa || LONEOS || — || align=right | 5.6 km || 
|-id=196 bgcolor=#fefefe
| 77196 ||  || — || March 19, 2001 || Anderson Mesa || LONEOS || — || align=right | 4.5 km || 
|-id=197 bgcolor=#fefefe
| 77197 ||  || — || March 19, 2001 || Anderson Mesa || LONEOS || — || align=right | 1.6 km || 
|-id=198 bgcolor=#E9E9E9
| 77198 ||  || — || March 19, 2001 || Anderson Mesa || LONEOS || — || align=right | 3.3 km || 
|-id=199 bgcolor=#fefefe
| 77199 ||  || — || March 19, 2001 || Anderson Mesa || LONEOS || — || align=right | 2.5 km || 
|-id=200 bgcolor=#E9E9E9
| 77200 ||  || — || March 19, 2001 || Anderson Mesa || LONEOS || — || align=right | 2.2 km || 
|}

77201–77300 

|-bgcolor=#E9E9E9
| 77201 ||  || — || March 19, 2001 || Anderson Mesa || LONEOS || — || align=right | 2.4 km || 
|-id=202 bgcolor=#d6d6d6
| 77202 ||  || — || March 19, 2001 || Anderson Mesa || LONEOS || HYG || align=right | 8.4 km || 
|-id=203 bgcolor=#fefefe
| 77203 ||  || — || March 19, 2001 || Anderson Mesa || LONEOS || — || align=right | 2.1 km || 
|-id=204 bgcolor=#E9E9E9
| 77204 ||  || — || March 19, 2001 || Anderson Mesa || LONEOS || — || align=right | 1.8 km || 
|-id=205 bgcolor=#E9E9E9
| 77205 ||  || — || March 19, 2001 || Anderson Mesa || LONEOS || — || align=right | 2.9 km || 
|-id=206 bgcolor=#fefefe
| 77206 ||  || — || March 19, 2001 || Anderson Mesa || LONEOS || FLO || align=right | 1.5 km || 
|-id=207 bgcolor=#d6d6d6
| 77207 ||  || — || March 21, 2001 || Anderson Mesa || LONEOS || — || align=right | 6.5 km || 
|-id=208 bgcolor=#E9E9E9
| 77208 ||  || — || March 21, 2001 || Anderson Mesa || LONEOS || — || align=right | 2.9 km || 
|-id=209 bgcolor=#fefefe
| 77209 ||  || — || March 21, 2001 || Anderson Mesa || LONEOS || — || align=right | 4.5 km || 
|-id=210 bgcolor=#fefefe
| 77210 ||  || — || March 21, 2001 || Anderson Mesa || LONEOS || FLO || align=right | 1.3 km || 
|-id=211 bgcolor=#E9E9E9
| 77211 ||  || — || March 21, 2001 || Anderson Mesa || LONEOS || — || align=right | 3.4 km || 
|-id=212 bgcolor=#fefefe
| 77212 ||  || — || March 21, 2001 || Anderson Mesa || LONEOS || — || align=right | 2.1 km || 
|-id=213 bgcolor=#fefefe
| 77213 ||  || — || March 21, 2001 || Anderson Mesa || LONEOS || FLO || align=right | 1.3 km || 
|-id=214 bgcolor=#fefefe
| 77214 ||  || — || March 21, 2001 || Anderson Mesa || LONEOS || V || align=right | 1.7 km || 
|-id=215 bgcolor=#fefefe
| 77215 ||  || — || March 21, 2001 || Anderson Mesa || LONEOS || — || align=right | 1.7 km || 
|-id=216 bgcolor=#E9E9E9
| 77216 ||  || — || March 17, 2001 || Socorro || LINEAR || slow? || align=right | 6.5 km || 
|-id=217 bgcolor=#fefefe
| 77217 ||  || — || March 18, 2001 || Socorro || LINEAR || — || align=right | 1.5 km || 
|-id=218 bgcolor=#E9E9E9
| 77218 ||  || — || March 18, 2001 || Socorro || LINEAR || — || align=right | 2.2 km || 
|-id=219 bgcolor=#fefefe
| 77219 ||  || — || March 18, 2001 || Socorro || LINEAR || FLO || align=right | 1.6 km || 
|-id=220 bgcolor=#E9E9E9
| 77220 ||  || — || March 19, 2001 || Socorro || LINEAR || — || align=right | 3.4 km || 
|-id=221 bgcolor=#fefefe
| 77221 ||  || — || March 19, 2001 || Socorro || LINEAR || — || align=right | 3.3 km || 
|-id=222 bgcolor=#fefefe
| 77222 ||  || — || March 19, 2001 || Socorro || LINEAR || — || align=right | 3.0 km || 
|-id=223 bgcolor=#E9E9E9
| 77223 ||  || — || March 18, 2001 || Haleakala || NEAT || RAF || align=right | 2.2 km || 
|-id=224 bgcolor=#E9E9E9
| 77224 ||  || — || March 22, 2001 || Kitt Peak || Spacewatch || — || align=right | 2.0 km || 
|-id=225 bgcolor=#E9E9E9
| 77225 ||  || — || March 18, 2001 || Socorro || LINEAR || — || align=right | 3.9 km || 
|-id=226 bgcolor=#fefefe
| 77226 ||  || — || March 18, 2001 || Socorro || LINEAR || NYS || align=right | 1.4 km || 
|-id=227 bgcolor=#fefefe
| 77227 ||  || — || March 18, 2001 || Socorro || LINEAR || V || align=right | 1.3 km || 
|-id=228 bgcolor=#E9E9E9
| 77228 ||  || — || March 18, 2001 || Socorro || LINEAR || — || align=right | 2.1 km || 
|-id=229 bgcolor=#fefefe
| 77229 ||  || — || March 18, 2001 || Socorro || LINEAR || — || align=right | 1.9 km || 
|-id=230 bgcolor=#fefefe
| 77230 ||  || — || March 18, 2001 || Socorro || LINEAR || — || align=right | 1.7 km || 
|-id=231 bgcolor=#fefefe
| 77231 ||  || — || March 18, 2001 || Socorro || LINEAR || NYS || align=right | 1.5 km || 
|-id=232 bgcolor=#E9E9E9
| 77232 ||  || — || March 18, 2001 || Socorro || LINEAR || — || align=right | 4.0 km || 
|-id=233 bgcolor=#fefefe
| 77233 ||  || — || March 18, 2001 || Socorro || LINEAR || FLO || align=right | 1.5 km || 
|-id=234 bgcolor=#E9E9E9
| 77234 ||  || — || March 18, 2001 || Socorro || LINEAR || — || align=right | 1.9 km || 
|-id=235 bgcolor=#fefefe
| 77235 ||  || — || March 18, 2001 || Socorro || LINEAR || V || align=right | 1.7 km || 
|-id=236 bgcolor=#E9E9E9
| 77236 ||  || — || March 18, 2001 || Socorro || LINEAR || — || align=right | 1.8 km || 
|-id=237 bgcolor=#fefefe
| 77237 ||  || — || March 18, 2001 || Socorro || LINEAR || NYS || align=right | 1.4 km || 
|-id=238 bgcolor=#fefefe
| 77238 ||  || — || March 18, 2001 || Socorro || LINEAR || V || align=right | 1.8 km || 
|-id=239 bgcolor=#fefefe
| 77239 ||  || — || March 18, 2001 || Socorro || LINEAR || NYS || align=right | 1.6 km || 
|-id=240 bgcolor=#fefefe
| 77240 ||  || — || March 18, 2001 || Socorro || LINEAR || — || align=right | 2.6 km || 
|-id=241 bgcolor=#fefefe
| 77241 ||  || — || March 18, 2001 || Socorro || LINEAR || FLO || align=right | 1.3 km || 
|-id=242 bgcolor=#E9E9E9
| 77242 ||  || — || March 18, 2001 || Socorro || LINEAR || — || align=right | 4.3 km || 
|-id=243 bgcolor=#fefefe
| 77243 ||  || — || March 18, 2001 || Socorro || LINEAR || NYS || align=right | 2.1 km || 
|-id=244 bgcolor=#fefefe
| 77244 ||  || — || March 18, 2001 || Socorro || LINEAR || — || align=right | 2.0 km || 
|-id=245 bgcolor=#fefefe
| 77245 ||  || — || March 18, 2001 || Socorro || LINEAR || MAS || align=right | 1.3 km || 
|-id=246 bgcolor=#d6d6d6
| 77246 ||  || — || March 18, 2001 || Socorro || LINEAR || — || align=right | 4.9 km || 
|-id=247 bgcolor=#fefefe
| 77247 ||  || — || March 18, 2001 || Socorro || LINEAR || NYS || align=right | 1.4 km || 
|-id=248 bgcolor=#fefefe
| 77248 ||  || — || March 18, 2001 || Socorro || LINEAR || V || align=right | 1.9 km || 
|-id=249 bgcolor=#E9E9E9
| 77249 ||  || — || March 18, 2001 || Socorro || LINEAR || — || align=right | 2.4 km || 
|-id=250 bgcolor=#E9E9E9
| 77250 ||  || — || March 18, 2001 || Socorro || LINEAR || — || align=right | 3.3 km || 
|-id=251 bgcolor=#fefefe
| 77251 ||  || — || March 18, 2001 || Socorro || LINEAR || NYS || align=right | 1.5 km || 
|-id=252 bgcolor=#E9E9E9
| 77252 ||  || — || March 18, 2001 || Socorro || LINEAR || ADE || align=right | 3.0 km || 
|-id=253 bgcolor=#fefefe
| 77253 ||  || — || March 18, 2001 || Socorro || LINEAR || — || align=right | 1.8 km || 
|-id=254 bgcolor=#E9E9E9
| 77254 ||  || — || March 18, 2001 || Socorro || LINEAR || MAR || align=right | 3.1 km || 
|-id=255 bgcolor=#E9E9E9
| 77255 ||  || — || March 18, 2001 || Socorro || LINEAR || — || align=right | 3.4 km || 
|-id=256 bgcolor=#fefefe
| 77256 ||  || — || March 18, 2001 || Socorro || LINEAR || V || align=right | 1.5 km || 
|-id=257 bgcolor=#fefefe
| 77257 ||  || — || March 18, 2001 || Socorro || LINEAR || NYS || align=right | 1.7 km || 
|-id=258 bgcolor=#E9E9E9
| 77258 ||  || — || March 18, 2001 || Socorro || LINEAR || — || align=right | 3.0 km || 
|-id=259 bgcolor=#E9E9E9
| 77259 ||  || — || March 18, 2001 || Socorro || LINEAR || — || align=right | 2.8 km || 
|-id=260 bgcolor=#fefefe
| 77260 ||  || — || March 18, 2001 || Socorro || LINEAR || V || align=right | 1.6 km || 
|-id=261 bgcolor=#E9E9E9
| 77261 ||  || — || March 18, 2001 || Socorro || LINEAR || — || align=right | 2.5 km || 
|-id=262 bgcolor=#fefefe
| 77262 ||  || — || March 18, 2001 || Socorro || LINEAR || — || align=right | 1.8 km || 
|-id=263 bgcolor=#E9E9E9
| 77263 ||  || — || March 18, 2001 || Socorro || LINEAR || — || align=right | 2.8 km || 
|-id=264 bgcolor=#fefefe
| 77264 ||  || — || March 18, 2001 || Socorro || LINEAR || — || align=right | 1.8 km || 
|-id=265 bgcolor=#E9E9E9
| 77265 ||  || — || March 18, 2001 || Socorro || LINEAR || — || align=right | 3.5 km || 
|-id=266 bgcolor=#fefefe
| 77266 ||  || — || March 18, 2001 || Socorro || LINEAR || — || align=right | 1.9 km || 
|-id=267 bgcolor=#fefefe
| 77267 ||  || — || March 18, 2001 || Socorro || LINEAR || — || align=right | 2.7 km || 
|-id=268 bgcolor=#fefefe
| 77268 ||  || — || March 18, 2001 || Socorro || LINEAR || — || align=right | 2.0 km || 
|-id=269 bgcolor=#fefefe
| 77269 ||  || — || March 18, 2001 || Socorro || LINEAR || FLO || align=right | 1.5 km || 
|-id=270 bgcolor=#fefefe
| 77270 ||  || — || March 18, 2001 || Socorro || LINEAR || — || align=right | 2.3 km || 
|-id=271 bgcolor=#fefefe
| 77271 ||  || — || March 18, 2001 || Socorro || LINEAR || V || align=right | 2.6 km || 
|-id=272 bgcolor=#E9E9E9
| 77272 ||  || — || March 19, 2001 || Socorro || LINEAR || — || align=right | 1.9 km || 
|-id=273 bgcolor=#E9E9E9
| 77273 ||  || — || March 21, 2001 || Socorro || LINEAR || — || align=right | 4.6 km || 
|-id=274 bgcolor=#E9E9E9
| 77274 ||  || — || March 21, 2001 || Socorro || LINEAR || — || align=right | 2.4 km || 
|-id=275 bgcolor=#fefefe
| 77275 ||  || — || March 19, 2001 || Socorro || LINEAR || NYS || align=right | 1.8 km || 
|-id=276 bgcolor=#E9E9E9
| 77276 ||  || — || March 21, 2001 || Anderson Mesa || LONEOS || — || align=right | 2.5 km || 
|-id=277 bgcolor=#fefefe
| 77277 ||  || — || March 19, 2001 || Socorro || LINEAR || SUL || align=right | 3.6 km || 
|-id=278 bgcolor=#fefefe
| 77278 ||  || — || March 19, 2001 || Socorro || LINEAR || SUL || align=right | 5.0 km || 
|-id=279 bgcolor=#fefefe
| 77279 ||  || — || March 19, 2001 || Socorro || LINEAR || — || align=right | 1.9 km || 
|-id=280 bgcolor=#E9E9E9
| 77280 ||  || — || March 19, 2001 || Socorro || LINEAR || — || align=right | 2.2 km || 
|-id=281 bgcolor=#fefefe
| 77281 ||  || — || March 19, 2001 || Socorro || LINEAR || — || align=right | 2.0 km || 
|-id=282 bgcolor=#E9E9E9
| 77282 ||  || — || March 19, 2001 || Socorro || LINEAR || — || align=right | 5.1 km || 
|-id=283 bgcolor=#E9E9E9
| 77283 ||  || — || March 19, 2001 || Socorro || LINEAR || — || align=right | 4.2 km || 
|-id=284 bgcolor=#fefefe
| 77284 ||  || — || March 19, 2001 || Socorro || LINEAR || FLO || align=right | 1.5 km || 
|-id=285 bgcolor=#E9E9E9
| 77285 ||  || — || March 19, 2001 || Socorro || LINEAR || — || align=right | 5.2 km || 
|-id=286 bgcolor=#fefefe
| 77286 ||  || — || March 19, 2001 || Socorro || LINEAR || FLO || align=right | 1.5 km || 
|-id=287 bgcolor=#fefefe
| 77287 ||  || — || March 19, 2001 || Socorro || LINEAR || — || align=right | 2.0 km || 
|-id=288 bgcolor=#fefefe
| 77288 ||  || — || March 19, 2001 || Socorro || LINEAR || — || align=right | 2.2 km || 
|-id=289 bgcolor=#fefefe
| 77289 ||  || — || March 19, 2001 || Socorro || LINEAR || — || align=right | 3.2 km || 
|-id=290 bgcolor=#fefefe
| 77290 ||  || — || March 19, 2001 || Socorro || LINEAR || V || align=right | 1.8 km || 
|-id=291 bgcolor=#fefefe
| 77291 ||  || — || March 19, 2001 || Socorro || LINEAR || — || align=right | 3.3 km || 
|-id=292 bgcolor=#fefefe
| 77292 ||  || — || March 19, 2001 || Socorro || LINEAR || FLO || align=right | 1.7 km || 
|-id=293 bgcolor=#E9E9E9
| 77293 ||  || — || March 19, 2001 || Socorro || LINEAR || — || align=right | 3.0 km || 
|-id=294 bgcolor=#E9E9E9
| 77294 ||  || — || March 19, 2001 || Socorro || LINEAR || — || align=right | 2.7 km || 
|-id=295 bgcolor=#fefefe
| 77295 ||  || — || March 19, 2001 || Socorro || LINEAR || NYS || align=right | 1.3 km || 
|-id=296 bgcolor=#fefefe
| 77296 ||  || — || March 19, 2001 || Socorro || LINEAR || FLO || align=right | 1.8 km || 
|-id=297 bgcolor=#fefefe
| 77297 ||  || — || March 19, 2001 || Socorro || LINEAR || NYS || align=right | 1.8 km || 
|-id=298 bgcolor=#E9E9E9
| 77298 ||  || — || March 19, 2001 || Socorro || LINEAR || — || align=right | 2.5 km || 
|-id=299 bgcolor=#fefefe
| 77299 ||  || — || March 19, 2001 || Socorro || LINEAR || — || align=right | 2.5 km || 
|-id=300 bgcolor=#fefefe
| 77300 ||  || — || March 19, 2001 || Socorro || LINEAR || NYS || align=right | 1.5 km || 
|}

77301–77400 

|-bgcolor=#E9E9E9
| 77301 ||  || — || March 19, 2001 || Socorro || LINEAR || — || align=right | 2.8 km || 
|-id=302 bgcolor=#E9E9E9
| 77302 ||  || — || March 19, 2001 || Socorro || LINEAR || — || align=right | 3.2 km || 
|-id=303 bgcolor=#E9E9E9
| 77303 ||  || — || March 19, 2001 || Socorro || LINEAR || — || align=right | 4.3 km || 
|-id=304 bgcolor=#E9E9E9
| 77304 ||  || — || March 19, 2001 || Socorro || LINEAR || ADE || align=right | 6.2 km || 
|-id=305 bgcolor=#fefefe
| 77305 ||  || — || March 19, 2001 || Socorro || LINEAR || — || align=right | 2.0 km || 
|-id=306 bgcolor=#fefefe
| 77306 ||  || — || March 19, 2001 || Socorro || LINEAR || — || align=right | 2.2 km || 
|-id=307 bgcolor=#fefefe
| 77307 ||  || — || March 19, 2001 || Socorro || LINEAR || — || align=right | 2.0 km || 
|-id=308 bgcolor=#fefefe
| 77308 ||  || — || March 21, 2001 || Socorro || LINEAR || V || align=right | 1.8 km || 
|-id=309 bgcolor=#E9E9E9
| 77309 ||  || — || March 21, 2001 || Socorro || LINEAR || GEF || align=right | 3.3 km || 
|-id=310 bgcolor=#E9E9E9
| 77310 ||  || — || March 23, 2001 || Socorro || LINEAR || — || align=right | 3.3 km || 
|-id=311 bgcolor=#fefefe
| 77311 ||  || — || March 23, 2001 || Socorro || LINEAR || — || align=right | 1.8 km || 
|-id=312 bgcolor=#fefefe
| 77312 ||  || — || March 23, 2001 || Socorro || LINEAR || — || align=right | 2.2 km || 
|-id=313 bgcolor=#E9E9E9
| 77313 ||  || — || March 23, 2001 || Socorro || LINEAR || RAF || align=right | 2.3 km || 
|-id=314 bgcolor=#fefefe
| 77314 ||  || — || March 23, 2001 || Socorro || LINEAR || — || align=right | 2.2 km || 
|-id=315 bgcolor=#fefefe
| 77315 ||  || — || March 23, 2001 || Socorro || LINEAR || — || align=right | 1.7 km || 
|-id=316 bgcolor=#fefefe
| 77316 ||  || — || March 23, 2001 || Socorro || LINEAR || V || align=right | 1.4 km || 
|-id=317 bgcolor=#fefefe
| 77317 ||  || — || March 24, 2001 || Socorro || LINEAR || — || align=right | 1.8 km || 
|-id=318 bgcolor=#fefefe
| 77318 Danieltsui ||  ||  || March 27, 2001 || Desert Beaver || W. K. Y. Yeung || FLO || align=right | 1.6 km || 
|-id=319 bgcolor=#d6d6d6
| 77319 ||  || — || March 21, 2001 || Anderson Mesa || LONEOS || EOS || align=right | 4.1 km || 
|-id=320 bgcolor=#fefefe
| 77320 ||  || — || March 21, 2001 || Anderson Mesa || LONEOS || — || align=right | 1.4 km || 
|-id=321 bgcolor=#E9E9E9
| 77321 ||  || — || March 21, 2001 || Anderson Mesa || LONEOS || — || align=right | 2.4 km || 
|-id=322 bgcolor=#fefefe
| 77322 ||  || — || March 26, 2001 || Socorro || LINEAR || — || align=right | 1.9 km || 
|-id=323 bgcolor=#fefefe
| 77323 ||  || — || March 26, 2001 || Socorro || LINEAR || NYS || align=right | 1.5 km || 
|-id=324 bgcolor=#fefefe
| 77324 ||  || — || March 26, 2001 || Socorro || LINEAR || V || align=right | 2.0 km || 
|-id=325 bgcolor=#E9E9E9
| 77325 ||  || — || March 26, 2001 || Socorro || LINEAR || — || align=right | 5.0 km || 
|-id=326 bgcolor=#fefefe
| 77326 ||  || — || March 16, 2001 || Socorro || LINEAR || — || align=right | 2.4 km || 
|-id=327 bgcolor=#fefefe
| 77327 ||  || — || March 16, 2001 || Socorro || LINEAR || — || align=right | 2.2 km || 
|-id=328 bgcolor=#fefefe
| 77328 ||  || — || March 16, 2001 || Socorro || LINEAR || — || align=right | 2.0 km || 
|-id=329 bgcolor=#fefefe
| 77329 ||  || — || March 16, 2001 || Socorro || LINEAR || FLO || align=right | 1.6 km || 
|-id=330 bgcolor=#E9E9E9
| 77330 ||  || — || March 16, 2001 || Socorro || LINEAR || — || align=right | 2.8 km || 
|-id=331 bgcolor=#d6d6d6
| 77331 ||  || — || March 16, 2001 || Socorro || LINEAR || EOS || align=right | 5.0 km || 
|-id=332 bgcolor=#fefefe
| 77332 ||  || — || March 16, 2001 || Socorro || LINEAR || — || align=right | 1.9 km || 
|-id=333 bgcolor=#E9E9E9
| 77333 ||  || — || March 16, 2001 || Socorro || LINEAR || — || align=right | 4.1 km || 
|-id=334 bgcolor=#E9E9E9
| 77334 ||  || — || March 16, 2001 || Socorro || LINEAR || — || align=right | 3.2 km || 
|-id=335 bgcolor=#fefefe
| 77335 ||  || — || March 16, 2001 || Socorro || LINEAR || — || align=right | 1.9 km || 
|-id=336 bgcolor=#fefefe
| 77336 ||  || — || March 16, 2001 || Socorro || LINEAR || V || align=right | 1.8 km || 
|-id=337 bgcolor=#fefefe
| 77337 ||  || — || March 16, 2001 || Socorro || LINEAR || V || align=right | 1.4 km || 
|-id=338 bgcolor=#E9E9E9
| 77338 ||  || — || March 16, 2001 || Socorro || LINEAR || — || align=right | 8.9 km || 
|-id=339 bgcolor=#E9E9E9
| 77339 ||  || — || March 16, 2001 || Socorro || LINEAR || — || align=right | 3.4 km || 
|-id=340 bgcolor=#d6d6d6
| 77340 ||  || — || March 17, 2001 || Socorro || LINEAR || — || align=right | 7.7 km || 
|-id=341 bgcolor=#fefefe
| 77341 ||  || — || March 17, 2001 || Socorro || LINEAR || V || align=right | 1.7 km || 
|-id=342 bgcolor=#fefefe
| 77342 ||  || — || March 17, 2001 || Socorro || LINEAR || V || align=right | 1.2 km || 
|-id=343 bgcolor=#fefefe
| 77343 ||  || — || March 17, 2001 || Kitt Peak || Spacewatch || EUT || align=right | 1.2 km || 
|-id=344 bgcolor=#fefefe
| 77344 ||  || — || March 18, 2001 || Socorro || LINEAR || V || align=right | 1.9 km || 
|-id=345 bgcolor=#E9E9E9
| 77345 ||  || — || March 18, 2001 || Anderson Mesa || LONEOS || — || align=right | 2.5 km || 
|-id=346 bgcolor=#d6d6d6
| 77346 ||  || — || March 18, 2001 || Kitt Peak || Spacewatch || — || align=right | 3.9 km || 
|-id=347 bgcolor=#d6d6d6
| 77347 ||  || — || March 18, 2001 || Socorro || LINEAR || — || align=right | 6.5 km || 
|-id=348 bgcolor=#E9E9E9
| 77348 ||  || — || March 18, 2001 || Socorro || LINEAR || — || align=right | 2.5 km || 
|-id=349 bgcolor=#E9E9E9
| 77349 ||  || — || March 19, 2001 || Anderson Mesa || LONEOS || — || align=right | 4.7 km || 
|-id=350 bgcolor=#E9E9E9
| 77350 ||  || — || March 20, 2001 || Haleakala || NEAT || BRU || align=right | 4.3 km || 
|-id=351 bgcolor=#fefefe
| 77351 ||  || — || March 27, 2001 || Kitt Peak || Spacewatch || — || align=right | 3.6 km || 
|-id=352 bgcolor=#E9E9E9
| 77352 ||  || — || March 27, 2001 || Kitt Peak || Spacewatch || EUN || align=right | 3.5 km || 
|-id=353 bgcolor=#fefefe
| 77353 ||  || — || March 26, 2001 || Socorro || LINEAR || — || align=right | 2.3 km || 
|-id=354 bgcolor=#E9E9E9
| 77354 ||  || — || March 23, 2001 || Haleakala || NEAT || — || align=right | 3.9 km || 
|-id=355 bgcolor=#E9E9E9
| 77355 ||  || — || March 23, 2001 || Anderson Mesa || LONEOS || — || align=right | 3.7 km || 
|-id=356 bgcolor=#E9E9E9
| 77356 ||  || — || March 23, 2001 || Anderson Mesa || LONEOS || — || align=right | 4.8 km || 
|-id=357 bgcolor=#fefefe
| 77357 ||  || — || March 26, 2001 || Kitt Peak || Spacewatch || V || align=right | 1.7 km || 
|-id=358 bgcolor=#fefefe
| 77358 ||  || — || March 26, 2001 || Socorro || LINEAR || — || align=right | 1.8 km || 
|-id=359 bgcolor=#fefefe
| 77359 ||  || — || March 26, 2001 || Socorro || LINEAR || — || align=right | 2.0 km || 
|-id=360 bgcolor=#E9E9E9
| 77360 ||  || — || March 26, 2001 || Socorro || LINEAR || — || align=right | 3.7 km || 
|-id=361 bgcolor=#E9E9E9
| 77361 ||  || — || March 26, 2001 || Socorro || LINEAR || — || align=right | 7.3 km || 
|-id=362 bgcolor=#fefefe
| 77362 ||  || — || March 29, 2001 || Socorro || LINEAR || MAS || align=right | 2.2 km || 
|-id=363 bgcolor=#fefefe
| 77363 ||  || — || March 31, 2001 || Desert Beaver || W. K. Y. Yeung || — || align=right | 1.9 km || 
|-id=364 bgcolor=#d6d6d6
| 77364 ||  || — || March 31, 2001 || Desert Beaver || W. K. Y. Yeung || — || align=right | 6.9 km || 
|-id=365 bgcolor=#E9E9E9
| 77365 ||  || — || March 20, 2001 || Kitt Peak || Spacewatch || EUN || align=right | 3.2 km || 
|-id=366 bgcolor=#E9E9E9
| 77366 ||  || — || March 20, 2001 || Haleakala || NEAT || — || align=right | 2.4 km || 
|-id=367 bgcolor=#E9E9E9
| 77367 ||  || — || March 20, 2001 || Haleakala || NEAT || — || align=right | 2.3 km || 
|-id=368 bgcolor=#E9E9E9
| 77368 ||  || — || March 20, 2001 || Haleakala || NEAT || HNS || align=right | 3.1 km || 
|-id=369 bgcolor=#E9E9E9
| 77369 ||  || — || March 21, 2001 || Anderson Mesa || LONEOS || — || align=right | 2.7 km || 
|-id=370 bgcolor=#E9E9E9
| 77370 ||  || — || March 21, 2001 || Anderson Mesa || LONEOS || — || align=right | 7.4 km || 
|-id=371 bgcolor=#E9E9E9
| 77371 ||  || — || March 21, 2001 || Anderson Mesa || LONEOS || — || align=right | 5.4 km || 
|-id=372 bgcolor=#d6d6d6
| 77372 ||  || — || March 21, 2001 || Anderson Mesa || LONEOS || — || align=right | 4.7 km || 
|-id=373 bgcolor=#d6d6d6
| 77373 ||  || — || March 21, 2001 || Anderson Mesa || LONEOS || — || align=right | 7.2 km || 
|-id=374 bgcolor=#E9E9E9
| 77374 ||  || — || March 21, 2001 || Anderson Mesa || LONEOS || — || align=right | 5.7 km || 
|-id=375 bgcolor=#d6d6d6
| 77375 ||  || — || March 21, 2001 || Anderson Mesa || LONEOS || — || align=right | 9.6 km || 
|-id=376 bgcolor=#E9E9E9
| 77376 ||  || — || March 21, 2001 || Haleakala || NEAT || HNS || align=right | 4.6 km || 
|-id=377 bgcolor=#fefefe
| 77377 ||  || — || March 21, 2001 || Anderson Mesa || LONEOS || — || align=right | 2.2 km || 
|-id=378 bgcolor=#fefefe
| 77378 ||  || — || March 21, 2001 || Anderson Mesa || LONEOS || V || align=right | 1.4 km || 
|-id=379 bgcolor=#d6d6d6
| 77379 ||  || — || March 21, 2001 || Haleakala || NEAT || — || align=right | 7.3 km || 
|-id=380 bgcolor=#fefefe
| 77380 ||  || — || March 21, 2001 || Haleakala || NEAT || — || align=right | 1.6 km || 
|-id=381 bgcolor=#E9E9E9
| 77381 ||  || — || March 23, 2001 || Socorro || LINEAR || AER || align=right | 3.6 km || 
|-id=382 bgcolor=#fefefe
| 77382 ||  || — || March 23, 2001 || Anderson Mesa || LONEOS || — || align=right | 2.1 km || 
|-id=383 bgcolor=#E9E9E9
| 77383 ||  || — || March 23, 2001 || Anderson Mesa || LONEOS || INO || align=right | 2.6 km || 
|-id=384 bgcolor=#E9E9E9
| 77384 ||  || — || March 23, 2001 || Haleakala || NEAT || — || align=right | 3.3 km || 
|-id=385 bgcolor=#d6d6d6
| 77385 ||  || — || March 24, 2001 || Anderson Mesa || LONEOS || — || align=right | 3.5 km || 
|-id=386 bgcolor=#E9E9E9
| 77386 ||  || — || March 24, 2001 || Anderson Mesa || LONEOS || — || align=right | 2.2 km || 
|-id=387 bgcolor=#d6d6d6
| 77387 ||  || — || March 24, 2001 || Socorro || LINEAR || EOS || align=right | 4.0 km || 
|-id=388 bgcolor=#E9E9E9
| 77388 ||  || — || March 24, 2001 || Anderson Mesa || LONEOS || DOR || align=right | 6.9 km || 
|-id=389 bgcolor=#fefefe
| 77389 ||  || — || March 24, 2001 || Anderson Mesa || LONEOS || NYS || align=right | 1.2 km || 
|-id=390 bgcolor=#E9E9E9
| 77390 ||  || — || March 24, 2001 || Socorro || LINEAR || — || align=right | 5.7 km || 
|-id=391 bgcolor=#E9E9E9
| 77391 ||  || — || March 24, 2001 || Haleakala || NEAT || — || align=right | 2.5 km || 
|-id=392 bgcolor=#E9E9E9
| 77392 ||  || — || March 26, 2001 || Socorro || LINEAR || RAF || align=right | 3.1 km || 
|-id=393 bgcolor=#fefefe
| 77393 ||  || — || March 26, 2001 || Socorro || LINEAR || — || align=right | 1.2 km || 
|-id=394 bgcolor=#fefefe
| 77394 ||  || — || March 29, 2001 || Anderson Mesa || LONEOS || — || align=right | 1.7 km || 
|-id=395 bgcolor=#E9E9E9
| 77395 ||  || — || March 29, 2001 || Anderson Mesa || LONEOS || — || align=right | 7.7 km || 
|-id=396 bgcolor=#E9E9E9
| 77396 ||  || — || March 29, 2001 || Anderson Mesa || LONEOS || HEN || align=right | 2.6 km || 
|-id=397 bgcolor=#d6d6d6
| 77397 ||  || — || March 29, 2001 || Anderson Mesa || LONEOS || ALA || align=right | 8.5 km || 
|-id=398 bgcolor=#E9E9E9
| 77398 ||  || — || March 29, 2001 || Socorro || LINEAR || — || align=right | 2.6 km || 
|-id=399 bgcolor=#d6d6d6
| 77399 ||  || — || March 29, 2001 || Socorro || LINEAR || — || align=right | 11 km || 
|-id=400 bgcolor=#fefefe
| 77400 ||  || — || March 31, 2001 || Socorro || LINEAR || — || align=right | 1.8 km || 
|}

77401–77500 

|-bgcolor=#E9E9E9
| 77401 ||  || — || March 18, 2001 || Anderson Mesa || LONEOS || — || align=right | 5.5 km || 
|-id=402 bgcolor=#fefefe
| 77402 ||  || — || March 22, 2001 || Kitt Peak || Spacewatch || — || align=right | 2.2 km || 
|-id=403 bgcolor=#E9E9E9
| 77403 ||  || — || March 23, 2001 || Anderson Mesa || LONEOS || — || align=right | 7.4 km || 
|-id=404 bgcolor=#fefefe
| 77404 ||  || — || March 23, 2001 || Anderson Mesa || LONEOS || — || align=right | 2.6 km || 
|-id=405 bgcolor=#fefefe
| 77405 ||  || — || March 23, 2001 || Anderson Mesa || LONEOS || V || align=right | 1.4 km || 
|-id=406 bgcolor=#fefefe
| 77406 ||  || — || March 24, 2001 || Anderson Mesa || LONEOS || — || align=right | 1.9 km || 
|-id=407 bgcolor=#fefefe
| 77407 ||  || — || March 24, 2001 || Socorro || LINEAR || FLO || align=right | 1.8 km || 
|-id=408 bgcolor=#E9E9E9
| 77408 ||  || — || March 24, 2001 || Haleakala || NEAT || — || align=right | 3.7 km || 
|-id=409 bgcolor=#fefefe
| 77409 ||  || — || March 24, 2001 || Haleakala || NEAT || — || align=right | 3.6 km || 
|-id=410 bgcolor=#E9E9E9
| 77410 ||  || — || March 24, 2001 || Haleakala || NEAT || — || align=right | 4.0 km || 
|-id=411 bgcolor=#E9E9E9
| 77411 ||  || — || March 16, 2001 || Socorro || LINEAR || MIT || align=right | 5.6 km || 
|-id=412 bgcolor=#E9E9E9
| 77412 ||  || — || March 31, 2001 || Socorro || LINEAR || — || align=right | 3.8 km || 
|-id=413 bgcolor=#E9E9E9
| 77413 ||  || — || March 31, 2001 || Socorro || LINEAR || MAR || align=right | 3.5 km || 
|-id=414 bgcolor=#fefefe
| 77414 ||  || — || March 16, 2001 || Socorro || LINEAR || — || align=right | 2.3 km || 
|-id=415 bgcolor=#d6d6d6
| 77415 ||  || — || March 16, 2001 || Socorro || LINEAR || EOS || align=right | 5.6 km || 
|-id=416 bgcolor=#fefefe
| 77416 ||  || — || March 20, 2001 || Anderson Mesa || LONEOS || — || align=right | 2.1 km || 
|-id=417 bgcolor=#d6d6d6
| 77417 ||  || — || March 20, 2001 || Anderson Mesa || LONEOS || — || align=right | 4.7 km || 
|-id=418 bgcolor=#E9E9E9
| 77418 ||  || — || March 18, 2001 || Socorro || LINEAR || — || align=right | 5.1 km || 
|-id=419 bgcolor=#E9E9E9
| 77419 ||  || — || March 19, 2001 || Socorro || LINEAR || — || align=right | 4.6 km || 
|-id=420 bgcolor=#fefefe
| 77420 ||  || — || March 23, 2001 || Anderson Mesa || LONEOS || V || align=right | 1.5 km || 
|-id=421 bgcolor=#fefefe
| 77421 || 2001 GB || — || April 1, 2001 || Olathe || L. Robinson || ERI || align=right | 4.5 km || 
|-id=422 bgcolor=#fefefe
| 77422 || 2001 GH || — || April 1, 2001 || Socorro || LINEAR || NYS || align=right | 1.8 km || 
|-id=423 bgcolor=#fefefe
| 77423 || 2001 GM || — || April 1, 2001 || Socorro || LINEAR || NYS || align=right | 1.7 km || 
|-id=424 bgcolor=#fefefe
| 77424 || 2001 GO || — || April 1, 2001 || Socorro || LINEAR || NYS || align=right | 1.5 km || 
|-id=425 bgcolor=#d6d6d6
| 77425 || 2001 GY || — || April 13, 2001 || Kitt Peak || Spacewatch || KOR || align=right | 3.2 km || 
|-id=426 bgcolor=#d6d6d6
| 77426 ||  || — || April 14, 2001 || Socorro || LINEAR || — || align=right | 7.0 km || 
|-id=427 bgcolor=#d6d6d6
| 77427 ||  || — || April 15, 2001 || Socorro || LINEAR || MEL || align=right | 13 km || 
|-id=428 bgcolor=#fefefe
| 77428 ||  || — || April 15, 2001 || Socorro || LINEAR || V || align=right | 1.5 km || 
|-id=429 bgcolor=#E9E9E9
| 77429 ||  || — || April 15, 2001 || Socorro || LINEAR || EUN || align=right | 4.4 km || 
|-id=430 bgcolor=#d6d6d6
| 77430 ||  || — || April 13, 2001 || Kitt Peak || Spacewatch || — || align=right | 4.3 km || 
|-id=431 bgcolor=#d6d6d6
| 77431 ||  || — || April 14, 2001 || Kitt Peak || Spacewatch || — || align=right | 5.4 km || 
|-id=432 bgcolor=#d6d6d6
| 77432 ||  || — || April 14, 2001 || Kitt Peak || Spacewatch || — || align=right | 5.4 km || 
|-id=433 bgcolor=#E9E9E9
| 77433 ||  || — || April 15, 2001 || Socorro || LINEAR || MAR || align=right | 2.2 km || 
|-id=434 bgcolor=#fefefe
| 77434 ||  || — || April 15, 2001 || Socorro || LINEAR || — || align=right | 1.6 km || 
|-id=435 bgcolor=#d6d6d6
| 77435 ||  || — || April 15, 2001 || Socorro || LINEAR || — || align=right | 5.7 km || 
|-id=436 bgcolor=#fefefe
| 77436 ||  || — || April 15, 2001 || Socorro || LINEAR || V || align=right | 1.4 km || 
|-id=437 bgcolor=#fefefe
| 77437 ||  || — || April 15, 2001 || Socorro || LINEAR || FLO || align=right | 1.3 km || 
|-id=438 bgcolor=#d6d6d6
| 77438 ||  || — || April 15, 2001 || Haleakala || NEAT || — || align=right | 6.6 km || 
|-id=439 bgcolor=#E9E9E9
| 77439 ||  || — || April 15, 2001 || Haleakala || NEAT || — || align=right | 2.4 km || 
|-id=440 bgcolor=#fefefe
| 77440 ||  || — || April 15, 2001 || Haleakala || NEAT || — || align=right | 2.8 km || 
|-id=441 bgcolor=#E9E9E9
| 77441 Jouve || 2001 HU ||  || April 18, 2001 || Saint-Véran || Saint-Véran Obs. || — || align=right | 3.4 km || 
|-id=442 bgcolor=#d6d6d6
| 77442 ||  || — || April 17, 2001 || Socorro || LINEAR || — || align=right | 6.0 km || 
|-id=443 bgcolor=#fefefe
| 77443 ||  || — || April 17, 2001 || Socorro || LINEAR || — || align=right | 1.6 km || 
|-id=444 bgcolor=#d6d6d6
| 77444 ||  || — || April 17, 2001 || Socorro || LINEAR || THM || align=right | 7.0 km || 
|-id=445 bgcolor=#E9E9E9
| 77445 ||  || — || April 17, 2001 || Socorro || LINEAR || RAF || align=right | 2.7 km || 
|-id=446 bgcolor=#fefefe
| 77446 ||  || — || April 16, 2001 || Socorro || LINEAR || — || align=right | 2.0 km || 
|-id=447 bgcolor=#E9E9E9
| 77447 ||  || — || April 16, 2001 || Socorro || LINEAR || — || align=right | 4.1 km || 
|-id=448 bgcolor=#fefefe
| 77448 ||  || — || April 18, 2001 || Socorro || LINEAR || — || align=right | 2.0 km || 
|-id=449 bgcolor=#E9E9E9
| 77449 ||  || — || April 18, 2001 || Kitt Peak || Spacewatch || HEN || align=right | 2.1 km || 
|-id=450 bgcolor=#fefefe
| 77450 ||  || — || April 18, 2001 || Kitt Peak || Spacewatch || NYS || align=right | 1.8 km || 
|-id=451 bgcolor=#d6d6d6
| 77451 ||  || — || April 18, 2001 || Desert Beaver || W. K. Y. Yeung || — || align=right | 7.8 km || 
|-id=452 bgcolor=#fefefe
| 77452 ||  || — || April 16, 2001 || Socorro || LINEAR || NYS || align=right | 1.7 km || 
|-id=453 bgcolor=#d6d6d6
| 77453 ||  || — || April 16, 2001 || Socorro || LINEAR || — || align=right | 5.0 km || 
|-id=454 bgcolor=#d6d6d6
| 77454 ||  || — || April 16, 2001 || Socorro || LINEAR || — || align=right | 7.2 km || 
|-id=455 bgcolor=#E9E9E9
| 77455 ||  || — || April 16, 2001 || Socorro || LINEAR || — || align=right | 4.5 km || 
|-id=456 bgcolor=#E9E9E9
| 77456 ||  || — || April 16, 2001 || Socorro || LINEAR || — || align=right | 5.5 km || 
|-id=457 bgcolor=#d6d6d6
| 77457 ||  || — || April 18, 2001 || Socorro || LINEAR || — || align=right | 5.5 km || 
|-id=458 bgcolor=#E9E9E9
| 77458 ||  || — || April 18, 2001 || Socorro || LINEAR || — || align=right | 3.8 km || 
|-id=459 bgcolor=#E9E9E9
| 77459 ||  || — || April 18, 2001 || Socorro || LINEAR || EUN || align=right | 3.2 km || 
|-id=460 bgcolor=#E9E9E9
| 77460 ||  || — || April 18, 2001 || Socorro || LINEAR || — || align=right | 2.2 km || 
|-id=461 bgcolor=#fefefe
| 77461 ||  || — || April 21, 2001 || Socorro || LINEAR || PHO || align=right | 2.7 km || 
|-id=462 bgcolor=#d6d6d6
| 77462 ||  || — || April 24, 2001 || Desert Beaver || W. K. Y. Yeung || — || align=right | 4.8 km || 
|-id=463 bgcolor=#E9E9E9
| 77463 ||  || — || April 25, 2001 || Powell || Powell Obs. || — || align=right | 4.2 km || 
|-id=464 bgcolor=#E9E9E9
| 77464 ||  || — || April 22, 2001 || San Marcello || A. Boattini, L. Tesi || — || align=right | 5.0 km || 
|-id=465 bgcolor=#fefefe
| 77465 ||  || — || April 26, 2001 || Socorro || LINEAR || PHO || align=right | 2.7 km || 
|-id=466 bgcolor=#d6d6d6
| 77466 ||  || — || April 23, 2001 || Socorro || LINEAR || EOS || align=right | 6.1 km || 
|-id=467 bgcolor=#E9E9E9
| 77467 ||  || — || April 23, 2001 || Socorro || LINEAR || GEF || align=right | 2.4 km || 
|-id=468 bgcolor=#d6d6d6
| 77468 ||  || — || April 23, 2001 || Socorro || LINEAR || — || align=right | 6.5 km || 
|-id=469 bgcolor=#E9E9E9
| 77469 ||  || — || April 27, 2001 || Kitt Peak || Spacewatch || — || align=right | 4.0 km || 
|-id=470 bgcolor=#E9E9E9
| 77470 ||  || — || April 27, 2001 || Desert Beaver || W. K. Y. Yeung || GER || align=right | 5.7 km || 
|-id=471 bgcolor=#E9E9E9
| 77471 ||  || — || April 27, 2001 || Socorro || LINEAR || — || align=right | 2.2 km || 
|-id=472 bgcolor=#E9E9E9
| 77472 ||  || — || April 27, 2001 || Socorro || LINEAR || — || align=right | 2.4 km || 
|-id=473 bgcolor=#d6d6d6
| 77473 ||  || — || April 27, 2001 || Socorro || LINEAR || — || align=right | 5.5 km || 
|-id=474 bgcolor=#fefefe
| 77474 ||  || — || April 27, 2001 || Socorro || LINEAR || — || align=right | 1.9 km || 
|-id=475 bgcolor=#E9E9E9
| 77475 ||  || — || April 27, 2001 || Socorro || LINEAR || GEF || align=right | 3.2 km || 
|-id=476 bgcolor=#fefefe
| 77476 ||  || — || April 27, 2001 || Socorro || LINEAR || NYS || align=right | 2.0 km || 
|-id=477 bgcolor=#d6d6d6
| 77477 ||  || — || April 27, 2001 || Socorro || LINEAR || — || align=right | 7.8 km || 
|-id=478 bgcolor=#fefefe
| 77478 ||  || — || April 27, 2001 || Socorro || LINEAR || — || align=right | 4.7 km || 
|-id=479 bgcolor=#d6d6d6
| 77479 ||  || — || April 27, 2001 || Socorro || LINEAR || — || align=right | 6.7 km || 
|-id=480 bgcolor=#E9E9E9
| 77480 ||  || — || April 27, 2001 || Socorro || LINEAR || — || align=right | 5.5 km || 
|-id=481 bgcolor=#E9E9E9
| 77481 ||  || — || April 27, 2001 || Socorro || LINEAR || — || align=right | 4.5 km || 
|-id=482 bgcolor=#fefefe
| 77482 ||  || — || April 27, 2001 || Socorro || LINEAR || NYS || align=right | 1.4 km || 
|-id=483 bgcolor=#fefefe
| 77483 ||  || — || April 27, 2001 || Kitt Peak || Spacewatch || — || align=right | 1.3 km || 
|-id=484 bgcolor=#E9E9E9
| 77484 ||  || — || April 26, 2001 || Desert Beaver || W. K. Y. Yeung || — || align=right | 6.8 km || 
|-id=485 bgcolor=#fefefe
| 77485 ||  || — || April 28, 2001 || Desert Beaver || W. K. Y. Yeung || V || align=right | 1.5 km || 
|-id=486 bgcolor=#fefefe
| 77486 ||  || — || April 28, 2001 || Desert Beaver || W. K. Y. Yeung || NYS || align=right | 1.8 km || 
|-id=487 bgcolor=#E9E9E9
| 77487 ||  || — || April 27, 2001 || Socorro || LINEAR || GEF || align=right | 2.1 km || 
|-id=488 bgcolor=#E9E9E9
| 77488 ||  || — || April 27, 2001 || Socorro || LINEAR || — || align=right | 2.5 km || 
|-id=489 bgcolor=#d6d6d6
| 77489 ||  || — || April 27, 2001 || Socorro || LINEAR || EOS || align=right | 5.6 km || 
|-id=490 bgcolor=#fefefe
| 77490 ||  || — || April 27, 2001 || Socorro || LINEAR || — || align=right | 2.7 km || 
|-id=491 bgcolor=#E9E9E9
| 77491 ||  || — || April 29, 2001 || Socorro || LINEAR || EUN || align=right | 3.0 km || 
|-id=492 bgcolor=#E9E9E9
| 77492 ||  || — || April 29, 2001 || Socorro || LINEAR || — || align=right | 2.9 km || 
|-id=493 bgcolor=#E9E9E9
| 77493 ||  || — || April 29, 2001 || Socorro || LINEAR || — || align=right | 2.4 km || 
|-id=494 bgcolor=#d6d6d6
| 77494 ||  || — || April 29, 2001 || Socorro || LINEAR || — || align=right | 10 km || 
|-id=495 bgcolor=#d6d6d6
| 77495 ||  || — || April 29, 2001 || Socorro || LINEAR || LIX || align=right | 9.6 km || 
|-id=496 bgcolor=#E9E9E9
| 77496 ||  || — || April 29, 2001 || Socorro || LINEAR || GEF || align=right | 3.2 km || 
|-id=497 bgcolor=#d6d6d6
| 77497 ||  || — || April 29, 2001 || Socorro || LINEAR || — || align=right | 8.1 km || 
|-id=498 bgcolor=#fefefe
| 77498 ||  || — || April 30, 2001 || Desert Beaver || W. K. Y. Yeung || — || align=right | 2.9 km || 
|-id=499 bgcolor=#d6d6d6
| 77499 ||  || — || April 26, 2001 || Kitt Peak || Spacewatch || KOR || align=right | 3.2 km || 
|-id=500 bgcolor=#E9E9E9
| 77500 ||  || — || April 27, 2001 || Socorro || LINEAR || — || align=right | 2.9 km || 
|}

77501–77600 

|-bgcolor=#E9E9E9
| 77501 ||  || — || April 27, 2001 || Socorro || LINEAR || — || align=right | 5.4 km || 
|-id=502 bgcolor=#fefefe
| 77502 ||  || — || April 16, 2001 || Anderson Mesa || LONEOS || — || align=right | 1.9 km || 
|-id=503 bgcolor=#E9E9E9
| 77503 ||  || — || April 17, 2001 || Anderson Mesa || LONEOS || GEF || align=right | 2.8 km || 
|-id=504 bgcolor=#E9E9E9
| 77504 ||  || — || April 17, 2001 || Anderson Mesa || LONEOS || — || align=right | 2.3 km || 
|-id=505 bgcolor=#E9E9E9
| 77505 ||  || — || April 17, 2001 || Anderson Mesa || LONEOS || — || align=right | 3.4 km || 
|-id=506 bgcolor=#E9E9E9
| 77506 ||  || — || April 18, 2001 || Socorro || LINEAR || — || align=right | 5.4 km || 
|-id=507 bgcolor=#E9E9E9
| 77507 ||  || — || April 18, 2001 || Haleakala || NEAT || — || align=right | 5.3 km || 
|-id=508 bgcolor=#E9E9E9
| 77508 ||  || — || April 19, 2001 || Haleakala || NEAT || — || align=right | 2.9 km || 
|-id=509 bgcolor=#E9E9E9
| 77509 ||  || — || April 19, 2001 || Haleakala || NEAT || EUN || align=right | 3.8 km || 
|-id=510 bgcolor=#E9E9E9
| 77510 ||  || — || April 21, 2001 || Socorro || LINEAR || — || align=right | 3.7 km || 
|-id=511 bgcolor=#d6d6d6
| 77511 ||  || — || April 21, 2001 || Socorro || LINEAR || — || align=right | 7.7 km || 
|-id=512 bgcolor=#E9E9E9
| 77512 ||  || — || April 21, 2001 || Socorro || LINEAR || — || align=right | 7.4 km || 
|-id=513 bgcolor=#fefefe
| 77513 ||  || — || April 21, 2001 || Socorro || LINEAR || — || align=right | 2.3 km || 
|-id=514 bgcolor=#E9E9E9
| 77514 ||  || — || April 21, 2001 || Socorro || LINEAR || — || align=right | 5.1 km || 
|-id=515 bgcolor=#E9E9E9
| 77515 ||  || — || April 22, 2001 || Haleakala || NEAT || — || align=right | 6.8 km || 
|-id=516 bgcolor=#E9E9E9
| 77516 ||  || — || April 23, 2001 || Kitt Peak || Spacewatch || — || align=right | 1.7 km || 
|-id=517 bgcolor=#E9E9E9
| 77517 ||  || — || April 23, 2001 || Socorro || LINEAR || — || align=right | 6.7 km || 
|-id=518 bgcolor=#E9E9E9
| 77518 ||  || — || April 23, 2001 || Socorro || LINEAR || — || align=right | 3.1 km || 
|-id=519 bgcolor=#E9E9E9
| 77519 ||  || — || April 23, 2001 || Socorro || LINEAR || — || align=right | 2.5 km || 
|-id=520 bgcolor=#E9E9E9
| 77520 ||  || — || April 23, 2001 || Socorro || LINEAR || — || align=right | 4.9 km || 
|-id=521 bgcolor=#fefefe
| 77521 ||  || — || April 23, 2001 || Socorro || LINEAR || — || align=right | 2.1 km || 
|-id=522 bgcolor=#d6d6d6
| 77522 ||  || — || April 24, 2001 || Anderson Mesa || LONEOS || — || align=right | 7.7 km || 
|-id=523 bgcolor=#d6d6d6
| 77523 ||  || — || April 24, 2001 || Socorro || LINEAR || EOS || align=right | 5.1 km || 
|-id=524 bgcolor=#d6d6d6
| 77524 ||  || — || April 24, 2001 || Socorro || LINEAR || ALA || align=right | 8.7 km || 
|-id=525 bgcolor=#fefefe
| 77525 ||  || — || April 24, 2001 || Haleakala || NEAT || NYS || align=right | 1.1 km || 
|-id=526 bgcolor=#E9E9E9
| 77526 ||  || — || April 25, 2001 || Anderson Mesa || LONEOS || — || align=right | 2.3 km || 
|-id=527 bgcolor=#E9E9E9
| 77527 ||  || — || April 25, 2001 || Anderson Mesa || LONEOS || — || align=right | 3.0 km || 
|-id=528 bgcolor=#E9E9E9
| 77528 ||  || — || April 25, 2001 || Haleakala || NEAT || PAE || align=right | 5.6 km || 
|-id=529 bgcolor=#E9E9E9
| 77529 ||  || — || April 24, 2001 || Anderson Mesa || LONEOS || MAR || align=right | 2.7 km || 
|-id=530 bgcolor=#E9E9E9
| 77530 ||  || — || April 24, 2001 || Anderson Mesa || LONEOS || — || align=right | 2.5 km || 
|-id=531 bgcolor=#d6d6d6
| 77531 ||  || — || April 24, 2001 || Anderson Mesa || LONEOS || — || align=right | 8.1 km || 
|-id=532 bgcolor=#E9E9E9
| 77532 ||  || — || April 24, 2001 || Anderson Mesa || LONEOS || MAR || align=right | 2.8 km || 
|-id=533 bgcolor=#d6d6d6
| 77533 ||  || — || April 24, 2001 || Kitt Peak || Spacewatch || — || align=right | 4.4 km || 
|-id=534 bgcolor=#E9E9E9
| 77534 ||  || — || April 24, 2001 || Haleakala || NEAT || — || align=right | 2.8 km || 
|-id=535 bgcolor=#fefefe
| 77535 ||  || — || April 26, 2001 || Anderson Mesa || LONEOS || V || align=right | 1.3 km || 
|-id=536 bgcolor=#fefefe
| 77536 ||  || — || April 26, 2001 || Anderson Mesa || LONEOS || FLO || align=right | 1.1 km || 
|-id=537 bgcolor=#fefefe
| 77537 ||  || — || April 26, 2001 || Anderson Mesa || LONEOS || V || align=right | 1.5 km || 
|-id=538 bgcolor=#E9E9E9
| 77538 ||  || — || April 27, 2001 || Socorro || LINEAR || — || align=right | 3.5 km || 
|-id=539 bgcolor=#E9E9E9
| 77539 ||  || — || April 27, 2001 || Socorro || LINEAR || MAR || align=right | 2.3 km || 
|-id=540 bgcolor=#fefefe
| 77540 ||  || — || April 27, 2001 || Socorro || LINEAR || NYS || align=right | 1.4 km || 
|-id=541 bgcolor=#E9E9E9
| 77541 ||  || — || April 27, 2001 || Haleakala || NEAT || — || align=right | 4.0 km || 
|-id=542 bgcolor=#fefefe
| 77542 ||  || — || April 30, 2001 || Socorro || LINEAR || V || align=right | 1.6 km || 
|-id=543 bgcolor=#fefefe
| 77543 ||  || — || April 25, 2001 || Anderson Mesa || LONEOS || V || align=right | 1.5 km || 
|-id=544 bgcolor=#fefefe
| 77544 ||  || — || April 27, 2001 || Haleakala || NEAT || NYS || align=right | 1.4 km || 
|-id=545 bgcolor=#d6d6d6
| 77545 ||  || — || May 12, 2001 || Anderson Mesa || LONEOS || — || align=right | 6.1 km || 
|-id=546 bgcolor=#E9E9E9
| 77546 ||  || — || May 11, 2001 || Haleakala || NEAT || — || align=right | 2.2 km || 
|-id=547 bgcolor=#E9E9E9
| 77547 ||  || — || May 15, 2001 || Kitt Peak || Spacewatch || — || align=right | 2.4 km || 
|-id=548 bgcolor=#E9E9E9
| 77548 ||  || — || May 15, 2001 || Haleakala || NEAT || — || align=right | 3.3 km || 
|-id=549 bgcolor=#fefefe
| 77549 ||  || — || May 10, 2001 || Haleakala || NEAT || V || align=right | 1.6 km || 
|-id=550 bgcolor=#E9E9E9
| 77550 ||  || — || May 15, 2001 || Anderson Mesa || LONEOS || — || align=right | 2.2 km || 
|-id=551 bgcolor=#E9E9E9
| 77551 ||  || — || May 14, 2001 || Kitt Peak || Spacewatch || — || align=right | 2.0 km || 
|-id=552 bgcolor=#fefefe
| 77552 ||  || — || May 15, 2001 || Anderson Mesa || LONEOS || NYS || align=right | 1.5 km || 
|-id=553 bgcolor=#E9E9E9
| 77553 ||  || — || May 15, 2001 || Anderson Mesa || LONEOS || — || align=right | 2.7 km || 
|-id=554 bgcolor=#fefefe
| 77554 ||  || — || May 15, 2001 || Anderson Mesa || LONEOS || — || align=right | 1.5 km || 
|-id=555 bgcolor=#E9E9E9
| 77555 ||  || — || May 15, 2001 || Kitt Peak || Spacewatch || — || align=right | 4.4 km || 
|-id=556 bgcolor=#E9E9E9
| 77556 ||  || — || May 15, 2001 || Anderson Mesa || LONEOS || — || align=right | 5.8 km || 
|-id=557 bgcolor=#fefefe
| 77557 ||  || — || May 15, 2001 || Palomar || NEAT || V || align=right | 2.0 km || 
|-id=558 bgcolor=#d6d6d6
| 77558 ||  || — || May 15, 2001 || Haleakala || NEAT || — || align=right | 6.5 km || 
|-id=559 bgcolor=#E9E9E9
| 77559 ||  || — || May 17, 2001 || Socorro || LINEAR || — || align=right | 6.5 km || 
|-id=560 bgcolor=#fefefe
| 77560 Furusato ||  ||  || May 17, 2001 || Saji || Saji Obs. || — || align=right | 1.6 km || 
|-id=561 bgcolor=#E9E9E9
| 77561 ||  || — || May 16, 2001 || Goodricke-Pigott || R. A. Tucker || — || align=right | 3.3 km || 
|-id=562 bgcolor=#d6d6d6
| 77562 ||  || — || May 17, 2001 || Socorro || LINEAR || — || align=right | 5.1 km || 
|-id=563 bgcolor=#fefefe
| 77563 ||  || — || May 17, 2001 || Socorro || LINEAR || FLO || align=right | 1.6 km || 
|-id=564 bgcolor=#d6d6d6
| 77564 ||  || — || May 17, 2001 || Socorro || LINEAR || TIR || align=right | 6.8 km || 
|-id=565 bgcolor=#E9E9E9
| 77565 ||  || — || May 17, 2001 || Socorro || LINEAR || — || align=right | 4.7 km || 
|-id=566 bgcolor=#fefefe
| 77566 ||  || — || May 17, 2001 || Socorro || LINEAR || V || align=right | 1.6 km || 
|-id=567 bgcolor=#d6d6d6
| 77567 ||  || — || May 17, 2001 || Socorro || LINEAR || — || align=right | 5.6 km || 
|-id=568 bgcolor=#d6d6d6
| 77568 ||  || — || May 17, 2001 || Socorro || LINEAR || — || align=right | 6.8 km || 
|-id=569 bgcolor=#d6d6d6
| 77569 ||  || — || May 17, 2001 || Socorro || LINEAR || KOR || align=right | 4.0 km || 
|-id=570 bgcolor=#E9E9E9
| 77570 ||  || — || May 18, 2001 || Socorro || LINEAR || HNA || align=right | 5.4 km || 
|-id=571 bgcolor=#d6d6d6
| 77571 ||  || — || May 18, 2001 || Socorro || LINEAR || EOS || align=right | 5.5 km || 
|-id=572 bgcolor=#d6d6d6
| 77572 ||  || — || May 18, 2001 || Socorro || LINEAR || — || align=right | 5.5 km || 
|-id=573 bgcolor=#fefefe
| 77573 ||  || — || May 18, 2001 || Socorro || LINEAR || — || align=right | 2.5 km || 
|-id=574 bgcolor=#fefefe
| 77574 ||  || — || May 18, 2001 || Socorro || LINEAR || NYS || align=right | 1.7 km || 
|-id=575 bgcolor=#fefefe
| 77575 ||  || — || May 18, 2001 || Socorro || LINEAR || FLO || align=right | 1.7 km || 
|-id=576 bgcolor=#d6d6d6
| 77576 ||  || — || May 18, 2001 || Socorro || LINEAR || URS || align=right | 9.9 km || 
|-id=577 bgcolor=#E9E9E9
| 77577 ||  || — || May 18, 2001 || Socorro || LINEAR || — || align=right | 2.6 km || 
|-id=578 bgcolor=#E9E9E9
| 77578 ||  || — || May 18, 2001 || Socorro || LINEAR || — || align=right | 2.2 km || 
|-id=579 bgcolor=#E9E9E9
| 77579 ||  || — || May 18, 2001 || Socorro || LINEAR || — || align=right | 2.9 km || 
|-id=580 bgcolor=#E9E9E9
| 77580 ||  || — || May 18, 2001 || Socorro || LINEAR || — || align=right | 6.1 km || 
|-id=581 bgcolor=#fefefe
| 77581 ||  || — || May 18, 2001 || Socorro || LINEAR || V || align=right | 1.7 km || 
|-id=582 bgcolor=#fefefe
| 77582 ||  || — || May 18, 2001 || Socorro || LINEAR || — || align=right | 1.9 km || 
|-id=583 bgcolor=#d6d6d6
| 77583 ||  || — || May 18, 2001 || Socorro || LINEAR || EOS || align=right | 4.4 km || 
|-id=584 bgcolor=#E9E9E9
| 77584 ||  || — || May 18, 2001 || Socorro || LINEAR || — || align=right | 2.7 km || 
|-id=585 bgcolor=#fefefe
| 77585 ||  || — || May 18, 2001 || Socorro || LINEAR || — || align=right | 1.9 km || 
|-id=586 bgcolor=#d6d6d6
| 77586 ||  || — || May 18, 2001 || Socorro || LINEAR || — || align=right | 4.8 km || 
|-id=587 bgcolor=#fefefe
| 77587 ||  || — || May 18, 2001 || Socorro || LINEAR || — || align=right | 1.9 km || 
|-id=588 bgcolor=#d6d6d6
| 77588 ||  || — || May 18, 2001 || Socorro || LINEAR || — || align=right | 4.9 km || 
|-id=589 bgcolor=#E9E9E9
| 77589 ||  || — || May 18, 2001 || Socorro || LINEAR || GEF || align=right | 2.9 km || 
|-id=590 bgcolor=#fefefe
| 77590 ||  || — || May 21, 2001 || Socorro || LINEAR || V || align=right | 1.8 km || 
|-id=591 bgcolor=#d6d6d6
| 77591 ||  || — || May 21, 2001 || Kitt Peak || Spacewatch || — || align=right | 3.9 km || 
|-id=592 bgcolor=#fefefe
| 77592 ||  || — || May 22, 2001 || Socorro || LINEAR || V || align=right | 1.7 km || 
|-id=593 bgcolor=#E9E9E9
| 77593 ||  || — || May 22, 2001 || Ondřejov || P. Kušnirák, P. Pravec || — || align=right | 2.5 km || 
|-id=594 bgcolor=#d6d6d6
| 77594 ||  || — || May 17, 2001 || Socorro || LINEAR || THM || align=right | 7.7 km || 
|-id=595 bgcolor=#d6d6d6
| 77595 ||  || — || May 17, 2001 || Socorro || LINEAR || — || align=right | 7.7 km || 
|-id=596 bgcolor=#E9E9E9
| 77596 ||  || — || May 17, 2001 || Socorro || LINEAR || — || align=right | 1.8 km || 
|-id=597 bgcolor=#E9E9E9
| 77597 ||  || — || May 17, 2001 || Socorro || LINEAR || — || align=right | 3.3 km || 
|-id=598 bgcolor=#d6d6d6
| 77598 ||  || — || May 17, 2001 || Socorro || LINEAR || — || align=right | 6.0 km || 
|-id=599 bgcolor=#d6d6d6
| 77599 ||  || — || May 17, 2001 || Socorro || LINEAR || — || align=right | 8.6 km || 
|-id=600 bgcolor=#d6d6d6
| 77600 ||  || — || May 17, 2001 || Socorro || LINEAR || — || align=right | 4.9 km || 
|}

77601–77700 

|-bgcolor=#E9E9E9
| 77601 ||  || — || May 17, 2001 || Socorro || LINEAR || — || align=right | 4.4 km || 
|-id=602 bgcolor=#E9E9E9
| 77602 ||  || — || May 17, 2001 || Socorro || LINEAR || EUN || align=right | 3.4 km || 
|-id=603 bgcolor=#E9E9E9
| 77603 ||  || — || May 21, 2001 || Socorro || LINEAR || — || align=right | 3.0 km || 
|-id=604 bgcolor=#d6d6d6
| 77604 ||  || — || May 21, 2001 || Socorro || LINEAR || EOS || align=right | 4.7 km || 
|-id=605 bgcolor=#fefefe
| 77605 ||  || — || May 21, 2001 || Socorro || LINEAR || NYS || align=right | 1.6 km || 
|-id=606 bgcolor=#d6d6d6
| 77606 ||  || — || May 21, 2001 || Socorro || LINEAR || — || align=right | 6.9 km || 
|-id=607 bgcolor=#E9E9E9
| 77607 ||  || — || May 22, 2001 || Socorro || LINEAR || GEF || align=right | 2.4 km || 
|-id=608 bgcolor=#d6d6d6
| 77608 ||  || — || May 18, 2001 || Socorro || LINEAR || — || align=right | 7.6 km || 
|-id=609 bgcolor=#d6d6d6
| 77609 ||  || — || May 18, 2001 || Socorro || LINEAR || — || align=right | 5.8 km || 
|-id=610 bgcolor=#E9E9E9
| 77610 ||  || — || May 18, 2001 || Socorro || LINEAR || — || align=right | 6.1 km || 
|-id=611 bgcolor=#fefefe
| 77611 ||  || — || May 18, 2001 || Socorro || LINEAR || V || align=right | 1.6 km || 
|-id=612 bgcolor=#d6d6d6
| 77612 ||  || — || May 18, 2001 || Socorro || LINEAR || TIR || align=right | 8.7 km || 
|-id=613 bgcolor=#E9E9E9
| 77613 ||  || — || May 21, 2001 || Socorro || LINEAR || — || align=right | 5.3 km || 
|-id=614 bgcolor=#E9E9E9
| 77614 ||  || — || May 22, 2001 || Socorro || LINEAR || — || align=right | 3.3 km || 
|-id=615 bgcolor=#E9E9E9
| 77615 ||  || — || May 22, 2001 || Socorro || LINEAR || ADE || align=right | 5.8 km || 
|-id=616 bgcolor=#d6d6d6
| 77616 ||  || — || May 22, 2001 || Socorro || LINEAR || — || align=right | 7.2 km || 
|-id=617 bgcolor=#E9E9E9
| 77617 ||  || — || May 22, 2001 || Socorro || LINEAR || AER || align=right | 2.8 km || 
|-id=618 bgcolor=#E9E9E9
| 77618 ||  || — || May 22, 2001 || Socorro || LINEAR || — || align=right | 3.6 km || 
|-id=619 bgcolor=#E9E9E9
| 77619 ||  || — || May 23, 2001 || Socorro || LINEAR || — || align=right | 2.4 km || 
|-id=620 bgcolor=#E9E9E9
| 77620 ||  || — || May 23, 2001 || Socorro || LINEAR || MAR || align=right | 3.0 km || 
|-id=621 bgcolor=#d6d6d6
| 77621 Koten ||  ||  || May 25, 2001 || Ondřejov || P. Pravec, P. Kušnirák || — || align=right | 8.8 km || 
|-id=622 bgcolor=#d6d6d6
| 77622 ||  || — || May 22, 2001 || Socorro || LINEAR || EOS || align=right | 4.8 km || 
|-id=623 bgcolor=#fefefe
| 77623 ||  || — || May 22, 2001 || Socorro || LINEAR || — || align=right | 2.1 km || 
|-id=624 bgcolor=#d6d6d6
| 77624 ||  || — || May 22, 2001 || Socorro || LINEAR || — || align=right | 7.3 km || 
|-id=625 bgcolor=#d6d6d6
| 77625 ||  || — || May 22, 2001 || Socorro || LINEAR || EOS || align=right | 4.1 km || 
|-id=626 bgcolor=#E9E9E9
| 77626 ||  || — || May 22, 2001 || Socorro || LINEAR || MIT || align=right | 3.9 km || 
|-id=627 bgcolor=#E9E9E9
| 77627 ||  || — || May 22, 2001 || Socorro || LINEAR || — || align=right | 3.8 km || 
|-id=628 bgcolor=#E9E9E9
| 77628 ||  || — || May 22, 2001 || Socorro || LINEAR || — || align=right | 3.2 km || 
|-id=629 bgcolor=#d6d6d6
| 77629 ||  || — || May 23, 2001 || Socorro || LINEAR || EOS || align=right | 5.2 km || 
|-id=630 bgcolor=#d6d6d6
| 77630 ||  || — || May 24, 2001 || Socorro || LINEAR || EOS || align=right | 4.5 km || 
|-id=631 bgcolor=#fefefe
| 77631 ||  || — || May 24, 2001 || Socorro || LINEAR || — || align=right | 2.2 km || 
|-id=632 bgcolor=#E9E9E9
| 77632 ||  || — || May 24, 2001 || Socorro || LINEAR || — || align=right | 3.3 km || 
|-id=633 bgcolor=#fefefe
| 77633 ||  || — || May 18, 2001 || Anderson Mesa || LONEOS || NYS || align=right | 1.8 km || 
|-id=634 bgcolor=#E9E9E9
| 77634 ||  || — || May 18, 2001 || Anderson Mesa || LONEOS || — || align=right | 5.0 km || 
|-id=635 bgcolor=#E9E9E9
| 77635 ||  || — || May 22, 2001 || Socorro || LINEAR || — || align=right | 2.5 km || 
|-id=636 bgcolor=#d6d6d6
| 77636 ||  || — || May 22, 2001 || Socorro || LINEAR || — || align=right | 7.5 km || 
|-id=637 bgcolor=#fefefe
| 77637 ||  || — || May 22, 2001 || Socorro || LINEAR || PHO || align=right | 3.6 km || 
|-id=638 bgcolor=#E9E9E9
| 77638 ||  || — || May 23, 2001 || Socorro || LINEAR || — || align=right | 3.0 km || 
|-id=639 bgcolor=#d6d6d6
| 77639 ||  || — || May 26, 2001 || Socorro || LINEAR || — || align=right | 6.3 km || 
|-id=640 bgcolor=#fefefe
| 77640 ||  || — || May 26, 2001 || Socorro || LINEAR || V || align=right | 1.5 km || 
|-id=641 bgcolor=#E9E9E9
| 77641 ||  || — || May 26, 2001 || Socorro || LINEAR || — || align=right | 2.0 km || 
|-id=642 bgcolor=#E9E9E9
| 77642 ||  || — || May 26, 2001 || Socorro || LINEAR || — || align=right | 2.4 km || 
|-id=643 bgcolor=#E9E9E9
| 77643 ||  || — || May 16, 2001 || Haleakala || NEAT || — || align=right | 3.1 km || 
|-id=644 bgcolor=#d6d6d6
| 77644 ||  || — || May 22, 2001 || Anderson Mesa || LONEOS || — || align=right | 8.2 km || 
|-id=645 bgcolor=#fefefe
| 77645 ||  || — || May 30, 2001 || Socorro || LINEAR || PHO || align=right | 3.4 km || 
|-id=646 bgcolor=#E9E9E9
| 77646 ||  || — || May 27, 2001 || Haleakala || NEAT || — || align=right | 6.6 km || 
|-id=647 bgcolor=#E9E9E9
| 77647 ||  || — || May 22, 2001 || Anderson Mesa || LONEOS || — || align=right | 2.4 km || 
|-id=648 bgcolor=#fefefe
| 77648 ||  || — || May 22, 2001 || Anderson Mesa || LONEOS || — || align=right | 7.7 km || 
|-id=649 bgcolor=#d6d6d6
| 77649 ||  || — || May 22, 2001 || Socorro || LINEAR || — || align=right | 7.4 km || 
|-id=650 bgcolor=#fefefe
| 77650 ||  || — || May 24, 2001 || Anderson Mesa || LONEOS || NYS || align=right | 1.2 km || 
|-id=651 bgcolor=#E9E9E9
| 77651 ||  || — || May 24, 2001 || Palomar || NEAT || — || align=right | 3.4 km || 
|-id=652 bgcolor=#d6d6d6
| 77652 ||  || — || May 24, 2001 || Socorro || LINEAR || THM || align=right | 4.6 km || 
|-id=653 bgcolor=#d6d6d6
| 77653 ||  || — || May 24, 2001 || Socorro || LINEAR || — || align=right | 8.3 km || 
|-id=654 bgcolor=#fefefe
| 77654 ||  || — || May 24, 2001 || Socorro || LINEAR || NYS || align=right | 1.2 km || 
|-id=655 bgcolor=#fefefe
| 77655 ||  || — || May 24, 2001 || Socorro || LINEAR || — || align=right | 2.7 km || 
|-id=656 bgcolor=#E9E9E9
| 77656 ||  || — || June 13, 2001 || Socorro || LINEAR || DOR || align=right | 9.5 km || 
|-id=657 bgcolor=#E9E9E9
| 77657 ||  || — || June 15, 2001 || Palomar || NEAT || — || align=right | 3.8 km || 
|-id=658 bgcolor=#fefefe
| 77658 ||  || — || June 15, 2001 || Palomar || NEAT || — || align=right | 2.6 km || 
|-id=659 bgcolor=#d6d6d6
| 77659 ||  || — || June 12, 2001 || Kitt Peak || Spacewatch || — || align=right | 9.6 km || 
|-id=660 bgcolor=#d6d6d6
| 77660 ||  || — || June 15, 2001 || Haleakala || NEAT || — || align=right | 7.1 km || 
|-id=661 bgcolor=#d6d6d6
| 77661 ||  || — || June 15, 2001 || Palomar || NEAT || — || align=right | 11 km || 
|-id=662 bgcolor=#E9E9E9
| 77662 ||  || — || June 15, 2001 || Socorro || LINEAR || — || align=right | 3.4 km || 
|-id=663 bgcolor=#E9E9E9
| 77663 ||  || — || June 15, 2001 || Socorro || LINEAR || — || align=right | 6.8 km || 
|-id=664 bgcolor=#d6d6d6
| 77664 ||  || — || June 12, 2001 || Haleakala || NEAT || EOS || align=right | 3.8 km || 
|-id=665 bgcolor=#d6d6d6
| 77665 ||  || — || June 12, 2001 || Haleakala || NEAT || — || align=right | 6.2 km || 
|-id=666 bgcolor=#d6d6d6
| 77666 ||  || — || June 15, 2001 || Socorro || LINEAR || EOS || align=right | 5.3 km || 
|-id=667 bgcolor=#d6d6d6
| 77667 ||  || — || June 15, 2001 || Palomar || NEAT || — || align=right | 7.1 km || 
|-id=668 bgcolor=#fefefe
| 77668 ||  || — || June 15, 2001 || Socorro || LINEAR || FLO || align=right | 1.7 km || 
|-id=669 bgcolor=#d6d6d6
| 77669 ||  || — || June 23, 2001 || Palomar || NEAT || — || align=right | 6.7 km || 
|-id=670 bgcolor=#fefefe
| 77670 ||  || — || June 27, 2001 || Palomar || NEAT || PHO || align=right | 3.2 km || 
|-id=671 bgcolor=#d6d6d6
| 77671 ||  || — || June 23, 2001 || Palomar || NEAT || — || align=right | 8.0 km || 
|-id=672 bgcolor=#d6d6d6
| 77672 ||  || — || June 28, 2001 || Anderson Mesa || LONEOS || — || align=right | 7.5 km || 
|-id=673 bgcolor=#E9E9E9
| 77673 ||  || — || June 25, 2001 || Palomar || NEAT || — || align=right | 4.0 km || 
|-id=674 bgcolor=#E9E9E9
| 77674 ||  || — || June 25, 2001 || Palomar || NEAT || — || align=right | 3.7 km || 
|-id=675 bgcolor=#E9E9E9
| 77675 ||  || — || June 28, 2001 || Palomar || NEAT || — || align=right | 3.2 km || 
|-id=676 bgcolor=#d6d6d6
| 77676 ||  || — || June 28, 2001 || Palomar || NEAT || — || align=right | 4.3 km || 
|-id=677 bgcolor=#fefefe
| 77677 ||  || — || June 16, 2001 || Anderson Mesa || LONEOS || — || align=right | 2.5 km || 
|-id=678 bgcolor=#d6d6d6
| 77678 ||  || — || June 20, 2001 || Anderson Mesa || LONEOS || — || align=right | 5.1 km || 
|-id=679 bgcolor=#d6d6d6
| 77679 ||  || — || June 20, 2001 || Anderson Mesa || LONEOS || — || align=right | 6.4 km || 
|-id=680 bgcolor=#d6d6d6
| 77680 ||  || — || June 27, 2001 || Anderson Mesa || LONEOS || CRO || align=right | 9.0 km || 
|-id=681 bgcolor=#E9E9E9
| 77681 ||  || — || June 27, 2001 || Anderson Mesa || LONEOS || — || align=right | 1.8 km || 
|-id=682 bgcolor=#d6d6d6
| 77682 ||  || — || June 29, 2001 || Anderson Mesa || LONEOS || — || align=right | 14 km || 
|-id=683 bgcolor=#E9E9E9
| 77683 || 2001 NN || — || July 9, 2001 || Palomar || NEAT || — || align=right | 5.0 km || 
|-id=684 bgcolor=#E9E9E9
| 77684 || 2001 NO || — || July 9, 2001 || Palomar || NEAT || — || align=right | 5.7 km || 
|-id=685 bgcolor=#d6d6d6
| 77685 ||  || — || July 13, 2001 || Palomar || NEAT || EOS || align=right | 7.3 km || 
|-id=686 bgcolor=#d6d6d6
| 77686 ||  || — || July 13, 2001 || Palomar || NEAT || — || align=right | 9.9 km || 
|-id=687 bgcolor=#d6d6d6
| 77687 ||  || — || July 13, 2001 || Palomar || NEAT || EOS || align=right | 3.5 km || 
|-id=688 bgcolor=#d6d6d6
| 77688 ||  || — || July 14, 2001 || Palomar || NEAT || — || align=right | 3.6 km || 
|-id=689 bgcolor=#d6d6d6
| 77689 ||  || — || July 14, 2001 || Haleakala || NEAT || — || align=right | 3.9 km || 
|-id=690 bgcolor=#d6d6d6
| 77690 ||  || — || July 13, 2001 || Palomar || NEAT || EOS || align=right | 8.4 km || 
|-id=691 bgcolor=#d6d6d6
| 77691 ||  || — || July 13, 2001 || Haleakala || NEAT || — || align=right | 6.9 km || 
|-id=692 bgcolor=#E9E9E9
| 77692 ||  || — || July 13, 2001 || Palomar || NEAT || DOR || align=right | 5.8 km || 
|-id=693 bgcolor=#d6d6d6
| 77693 ||  || — || July 14, 2001 || Palomar || NEAT || — || align=right | 7.7 km || 
|-id=694 bgcolor=#d6d6d6
| 77694 ||  || — || July 12, 2001 || Haleakala || NEAT || — || align=right | 7.0 km || 
|-id=695 bgcolor=#d6d6d6
| 77695 ||  || — || July 12, 2001 || Haleakala || NEAT || — || align=right | 4.9 km || 
|-id=696 bgcolor=#d6d6d6
| 77696 Patriciann ||  ||  || July 18, 2001 || Nashville || R. Clingan || HYG || align=right | 4.8 km || 
|-id=697 bgcolor=#fefefe
| 77697 ||  || — || July 19, 2001 || Reedy Creek || J. Broughton || — || align=right | 2.1 km || 
|-id=698 bgcolor=#d6d6d6
| 77698 ||  || — || July 17, 2001 || Palomar || NEAT || — || align=right | 5.2 km || 
|-id=699 bgcolor=#d6d6d6
| 77699 ||  || — || July 18, 2001 || Palomar || NEAT || EOS || align=right | 4.0 km || 
|-id=700 bgcolor=#E9E9E9
| 77700 ||  || — || July 19, 2001 || Palomar || NEAT || — || align=right | 4.0 km || 
|}

77701–77800 

|-bgcolor=#E9E9E9
| 77701 ||  || — || July 17, 2001 || Anderson Mesa || LONEOS || DOR || align=right | 6.1 km || 
|-id=702 bgcolor=#d6d6d6
| 77702 ||  || — || July 22, 2001 || Palomar || NEAT || — || align=right | 5.5 km || 
|-id=703 bgcolor=#d6d6d6
| 77703 ||  || — || July 16, 2001 || Anderson Mesa || LONEOS || — || align=right | 11 km || 
|-id=704 bgcolor=#d6d6d6
| 77704 ||  || — || July 18, 2001 || Palomar || NEAT || — || align=right | 8.0 km || 
|-id=705 bgcolor=#d6d6d6
| 77705 ||  || — || July 18, 2001 || Palomar || NEAT || VER || align=right | 7.6 km || 
|-id=706 bgcolor=#d6d6d6
| 77706 ||  || — || July 18, 2001 || Palomar || NEAT || ARM || align=right | 9.0 km || 
|-id=707 bgcolor=#d6d6d6
| 77707 ||  || — || July 19, 2001 || Palomar || NEAT || EOS || align=right | 5.7 km || 
|-id=708 bgcolor=#d6d6d6
| 77708 ||  || — || July 22, 2001 || Palomar || NEAT || EOS || align=right | 5.4 km || 
|-id=709 bgcolor=#d6d6d6
| 77709 ||  || — || July 21, 2001 || Palomar || NEAT || — || align=right | 5.5 km || 
|-id=710 bgcolor=#E9E9E9
| 77710 ||  || — || July 21, 2001 || Palomar || NEAT || — || align=right | 4.0 km || 
|-id=711 bgcolor=#d6d6d6
| 77711 ||  || — || July 23, 2001 || Palomar || NEAT || — || align=right | 7.5 km || 
|-id=712 bgcolor=#E9E9E9
| 77712 ||  || — || July 16, 2001 || Anderson Mesa || LONEOS || — || align=right | 3.5 km || 
|-id=713 bgcolor=#E9E9E9
| 77713 ||  || — || July 16, 2001 || Anderson Mesa || LONEOS || — || align=right | 4.8 km || 
|-id=714 bgcolor=#d6d6d6
| 77714 ||  || — || July 16, 2001 || Anderson Mesa || LONEOS || EOS || align=right | 6.2 km || 
|-id=715 bgcolor=#d6d6d6
| 77715 ||  || — || July 16, 2001 || Haleakala || NEAT || — || align=right | 7.3 km || 
|-id=716 bgcolor=#d6d6d6
| 77716 ||  || — || July 19, 2001 || Haleakala || NEAT || EUP || align=right | 10 km || 
|-id=717 bgcolor=#d6d6d6
| 77717 ||  || — || July 21, 2001 || Palomar || NEAT || EOS || align=right | 5.0 km || 
|-id=718 bgcolor=#E9E9E9
| 77718 ||  || — || July 21, 2001 || Palomar || NEAT || — || align=right | 5.5 km || 
|-id=719 bgcolor=#d6d6d6
| 77719 ||  || — || July 21, 2001 || Palomar || NEAT || EOS || align=right | 4.7 km || 
|-id=720 bgcolor=#d6d6d6
| 77720 ||  || — || July 21, 2001 || Palomar || NEAT || LUT || align=right | 9.3 km || 
|-id=721 bgcolor=#d6d6d6
| 77721 ||  || — || July 21, 2001 || Palomar || NEAT || — || align=right | 5.1 km || 
|-id=722 bgcolor=#d6d6d6
| 77722 ||  || — || July 21, 2001 || Palomar || NEAT || — || align=right | 11 km || 
|-id=723 bgcolor=#d6d6d6
| 77723 ||  || — || July 22, 2001 || Palomar || NEAT || BRA || align=right | 4.6 km || 
|-id=724 bgcolor=#d6d6d6
| 77724 ||  || — || July 16, 2001 || Anderson Mesa || LONEOS || — || align=right | 11 km || 
|-id=725 bgcolor=#d6d6d6
| 77725 ||  || — || July 21, 2001 || Haleakala || NEAT || — || align=right | 5.2 km || 
|-id=726 bgcolor=#d6d6d6
| 77726 ||  || — || July 23, 2001 || Haleakala || NEAT || EOS || align=right | 4.3 km || 
|-id=727 bgcolor=#d6d6d6
| 77727 ||  || — || July 24, 2001 || Haleakala || NEAT || — || align=right | 4.3 km || 
|-id=728 bgcolor=#d6d6d6
| 77728 ||  || — || July 25, 2001 || Haleakala || NEAT || — || align=right | 5.1 km || 
|-id=729 bgcolor=#d6d6d6
| 77729 ||  || — || July 17, 2001 || Palomar || NEAT || — || align=right | 4.3 km || 
|-id=730 bgcolor=#d6d6d6
| 77730 ||  || — || July 18, 2001 || Haleakala || NEAT || — || align=right | 5.2 km || 
|-id=731 bgcolor=#d6d6d6
| 77731 ||  || — || July 19, 2001 || Anderson Mesa || LONEOS || BRA || align=right | 5.5 km || 
|-id=732 bgcolor=#d6d6d6
| 77732 ||  || — || July 21, 2001 || Haleakala || NEAT || ALA || align=right | 11 km || 
|-id=733 bgcolor=#E9E9E9
| 77733 ||  || — || July 21, 2001 || Kitt Peak || Spacewatch || GEF || align=right | 3.5 km || 
|-id=734 bgcolor=#d6d6d6
| 77734 ||  || — || July 19, 2001 || Haleakala || NEAT || 3:2 || align=right | 5.4 km || 
|-id=735 bgcolor=#d6d6d6
| 77735 ||  || — || July 19, 2001 || Haleakala || NEAT || 7:4 || align=right | 12 km || 
|-id=736 bgcolor=#d6d6d6
| 77736 ||  || — || July 26, 2001 || Palomar || NEAT || EOS || align=right | 4.6 km || 
|-id=737 bgcolor=#E9E9E9
| 77737 ||  || — || July 29, 2001 || Palomar || NEAT || — || align=right | 3.2 km || 
|-id=738 bgcolor=#d6d6d6
| 77738 ||  || — || July 27, 2001 || Palomar || NEAT || NAE || align=right | 6.2 km || 
|-id=739 bgcolor=#d6d6d6
| 77739 ||  || — || July 20, 2001 || Anderson Mesa || LONEOS || URS || align=right | 8.4 km || 
|-id=740 bgcolor=#d6d6d6
| 77740 ||  || — || July 21, 2001 || Haleakala || NEAT || EOS || align=right | 6.8 km || 
|-id=741 bgcolor=#d6d6d6
| 77741 ||  || — || July 27, 2001 || Anderson Mesa || LONEOS || HYG || align=right | 5.2 km || 
|-id=742 bgcolor=#d6d6d6
| 77742 ||  || — || July 27, 2001 || Bergisch Gladbach || W. Bickel || — || align=right | 7.2 km || 
|-id=743 bgcolor=#d6d6d6
| 77743 ||  || — || July 23, 2001 || Palomar || NEAT || ALA || align=right | 13 km || 
|-id=744 bgcolor=#d6d6d6
| 77744 ||  || — || July 27, 2001 || Haleakala || NEAT || — || align=right | 6.9 km || 
|-id=745 bgcolor=#d6d6d6
| 77745 ||  || — || July 30, 2001 || Socorro || LINEAR || EUP || align=right | 13 km || 
|-id=746 bgcolor=#d6d6d6
| 77746 ||  || — || July 31, 2001 || Socorro || LINEAR || — || align=right | 10 km || 
|-id=747 bgcolor=#d6d6d6
| 77747 ||  || — || July 31, 2001 || Palomar || NEAT || — || align=right | 6.9 km || 
|-id=748 bgcolor=#d6d6d6
| 77748 ||  || — || July 18, 2001 || Palomar || NEAT || — || align=right | 8.2 km || 
|-id=749 bgcolor=#d6d6d6
| 77749 ||  || — || August 8, 2001 || Haleakala || NEAT || — || align=right | 4.3 km || 
|-id=750 bgcolor=#d6d6d6
| 77750 ||  || — || August 8, 2001 || Haleakala || NEAT || — || align=right | 8.5 km || 
|-id=751 bgcolor=#d6d6d6
| 77751 ||  || — || August 9, 2001 || Palomar || NEAT || ALA || align=right | 8.3 km || 
|-id=752 bgcolor=#d6d6d6
| 77752 ||  || — || August 9, 2001 || Palomar || NEAT || — || align=right | 4.8 km || 
|-id=753 bgcolor=#d6d6d6
| 77753 ||  || — || August 8, 2001 || Haleakala || NEAT || — || align=right | 4.6 km || 
|-id=754 bgcolor=#d6d6d6
| 77754 ||  || — || August 9, 2001 || Palomar || NEAT || — || align=right | 7.0 km || 
|-id=755 bgcolor=#d6d6d6
| 77755 Delémont ||  ||  || August 13, 2001 || Vicques || Jura Obs. || — || align=right | 4.3 km || 
|-id=756 bgcolor=#d6d6d6
| 77756 ||  || — || August 9, 2001 || Palomar || NEAT || VER || align=right | 6.0 km || 
|-id=757 bgcolor=#d6d6d6
| 77757 ||  || — || August 13, 2001 || Uccle || T. Pauwels || — || align=right | 6.4 km || 
|-id=758 bgcolor=#d6d6d6
| 77758 ||  || — || August 10, 2001 || Palomar || NEAT || — || align=right | 4.6 km || 
|-id=759 bgcolor=#d6d6d6
| 77759 ||  || — || August 11, 2001 || Palomar || NEAT || EOS || align=right | 6.0 km || 
|-id=760 bgcolor=#d6d6d6
| 77760 ||  || — || August 11, 2001 || Palomar || NEAT || FIR || align=right | 10 km || 
|-id=761 bgcolor=#E9E9E9
| 77761 ||  || — || August 11, 2001 || Haleakala || NEAT || — || align=right | 5.3 km || 
|-id=762 bgcolor=#d6d6d6
| 77762 ||  || — || August 14, 2001 || Palomar || NEAT || EOS || align=right | 6.0 km || 
|-id=763 bgcolor=#E9E9E9
| 77763 ||  || — || August 15, 2001 || Haleakala || NEAT || BRU || align=right | 7.2 km || 
|-id=764 bgcolor=#d6d6d6
| 77764 ||  || — || August 3, 2001 || Haleakala || NEAT || TIR || align=right | 5.5 km || 
|-id=765 bgcolor=#d6d6d6
| 77765 ||  || — || August 7, 2001 || Palomar || NEAT || EOS || align=right | 4.7 km || 
|-id=766 bgcolor=#d6d6d6
| 77766 ||  || — || August 14, 2001 || Haleakala || NEAT || — || align=right | 16 km || 
|-id=767 bgcolor=#d6d6d6
| 77767 ||  || — || August 13, 2001 || Haleakala || NEAT || 7:4 || align=right | 9.0 km || 
|-id=768 bgcolor=#d6d6d6
| 77768 || 2001 QM || — || August 16, 2001 || Reedy Creek || J. Broughton || — || align=right | 10 km || 
|-id=769 bgcolor=#d6d6d6
| 77769 ||  || — || August 16, 2001 || Socorro || LINEAR || EOS || align=right | 5.3 km || 
|-id=770 bgcolor=#d6d6d6
| 77770 ||  || — || August 16, 2001 || Socorro || LINEAR || EOS || align=right | 3.6 km || 
|-id=771 bgcolor=#E9E9E9
| 77771 ||  || — || August 16, 2001 || Socorro || LINEAR || — || align=right | 7.6 km || 
|-id=772 bgcolor=#d6d6d6
| 77772 ||  || — || August 16, 2001 || Socorro || LINEAR || EOS || align=right | 5.4 km || 
|-id=773 bgcolor=#d6d6d6
| 77773 ||  || — || August 16, 2001 || Socorro || LINEAR || — || align=right | 7.0 km || 
|-id=774 bgcolor=#d6d6d6
| 77774 ||  || — || August 16, 2001 || Socorro || LINEAR || — || align=right | 13 km || 
|-id=775 bgcolor=#d6d6d6
| 77775 ||  || — || August 16, 2001 || Socorro || LINEAR || HYG || align=right | 6.7 km || 
|-id=776 bgcolor=#d6d6d6
| 77776 ||  || — || August 16, 2001 || Socorro || LINEAR || — || align=right | 10 km || 
|-id=777 bgcolor=#d6d6d6
| 77777 ||  || — || August 16, 2001 || Socorro || LINEAR || HYG || align=right | 10 km || 
|-id=778 bgcolor=#d6d6d6
| 77778 ||  || — || August 16, 2001 || Socorro || LINEAR || — || align=right | 6.6 km || 
|-id=779 bgcolor=#d6d6d6
| 77779 ||  || — || August 16, 2001 || Socorro || LINEAR || — || align=right | 8.7 km || 
|-id=780 bgcolor=#d6d6d6
| 77780 ||  || — || August 16, 2001 || Socorro || LINEAR || URS || align=right | 9.0 km || 
|-id=781 bgcolor=#E9E9E9
| 77781 ||  || — || August 17, 2001 || Socorro || LINEAR || — || align=right | 5.9 km || 
|-id=782 bgcolor=#E9E9E9
| 77782 ||  || — || August 16, 2001 || Socorro || LINEAR || — || align=right | 6.4 km || 
|-id=783 bgcolor=#d6d6d6
| 77783 ||  || — || August 16, 2001 || Socorro || LINEAR || — || align=right | 4.4 km || 
|-id=784 bgcolor=#E9E9E9
| 77784 ||  || — || August 16, 2001 || Socorro || LINEAR || — || align=right | 2.9 km || 
|-id=785 bgcolor=#d6d6d6
| 77785 ||  || — || August 16, 2001 || Socorro || LINEAR || — || align=right | 7.3 km || 
|-id=786 bgcolor=#E9E9E9
| 77786 ||  || — || August 16, 2001 || Socorro || LINEAR || — || align=right | 4.1 km || 
|-id=787 bgcolor=#d6d6d6
| 77787 ||  || — || August 16, 2001 || Socorro || LINEAR || EOS || align=right | 5.6 km || 
|-id=788 bgcolor=#d6d6d6
| 77788 ||  || — || August 16, 2001 || Socorro || LINEAR || — || align=right | 7.7 km || 
|-id=789 bgcolor=#d6d6d6
| 77789 ||  || — || August 16, 2001 || Socorro || LINEAR || EOS || align=right | 4.1 km || 
|-id=790 bgcolor=#d6d6d6
| 77790 ||  || — || August 16, 2001 || Socorro || LINEAR || — || align=right | 8.7 km || 
|-id=791 bgcolor=#d6d6d6
| 77791 ||  || — || August 16, 2001 || Socorro || LINEAR || — || align=right | 7.5 km || 
|-id=792 bgcolor=#d6d6d6
| 77792 ||  || — || August 16, 2001 || Socorro || LINEAR || — || align=right | 8.4 km || 
|-id=793 bgcolor=#d6d6d6
| 77793 ||  || — || August 16, 2001 || Socorro || LINEAR || — || align=right | 4.2 km || 
|-id=794 bgcolor=#d6d6d6
| 77794 ||  || — || August 16, 2001 || Socorro || LINEAR || — || align=right | 7.3 km || 
|-id=795 bgcolor=#d6d6d6
| 77795 ||  || — || August 19, 2001 || Socorro || LINEAR || — || align=right | 5.9 km || 
|-id=796 bgcolor=#d6d6d6
| 77796 ||  || — || August 20, 2001 || Oakley || C. Wolfe || BRA || align=right | 4.6 km || 
|-id=797 bgcolor=#E9E9E9
| 77797 ||  || — || August 20, 2001 || Socorro || LINEAR || — || align=right | 4.1 km || 
|-id=798 bgcolor=#d6d6d6
| 77798 ||  || — || August 16, 2001 || Palomar || NEAT || — || align=right | 11 km || 
|-id=799 bgcolor=#fefefe
| 77799 ||  || — || August 19, 2001 || Socorro || LINEAR || H || align=right | 3.0 km || 
|-id=800 bgcolor=#d6d6d6
| 77800 ||  || — || August 16, 2001 || Palomar || NEAT || — || align=right | 3.5 km || 
|}

77801–77900 

|-bgcolor=#d6d6d6
| 77801 ||  || — || August 18, 2001 || Palomar || NEAT || — || align=right | 7.6 km || 
|-id=802 bgcolor=#d6d6d6
| 77802 ||  || — || August 19, 2001 || Socorro || LINEAR || — || align=right | 6.6 km || 
|-id=803 bgcolor=#d6d6d6
| 77803 ||  || — || August 19, 2001 || Socorro || LINEAR || — || align=right | 8.0 km || 
|-id=804 bgcolor=#d6d6d6
| 77804 ||  || — || August 17, 2001 || Socorro || LINEAR || — || align=right | 10 km || 
|-id=805 bgcolor=#d6d6d6
| 77805 ||  || — || August 19, 2001 || Socorro || LINEAR || EOS || align=right | 3.9 km || 
|-id=806 bgcolor=#E9E9E9
| 77806 ||  || — || August 19, 2001 || Socorro || LINEAR || — || align=right | 4.1 km || 
|-id=807 bgcolor=#d6d6d6
| 77807 ||  || — || August 19, 2001 || Socorro || LINEAR || VER || align=right | 7.8 km || 
|-id=808 bgcolor=#E9E9E9
| 77808 ||  || — || August 20, 2001 || Socorro || LINEAR || — || align=right | 3.2 km || 
|-id=809 bgcolor=#d6d6d6
| 77809 ||  || — || August 20, 2001 || Socorro || LINEAR || EOS || align=right | 5.1 km || 
|-id=810 bgcolor=#d6d6d6
| 77810 ||  || — || August 20, 2001 || Socorro || LINEAR || — || align=right | 5.6 km || 
|-id=811 bgcolor=#d6d6d6
| 77811 ||  || — || August 21, 2001 || Socorro || LINEAR || — || align=right | 6.7 km || 
|-id=812 bgcolor=#d6d6d6
| 77812 ||  || — || August 21, 2001 || Socorro || LINEAR || URS || align=right | 11 km || 
|-id=813 bgcolor=#d6d6d6
| 77813 ||  || — || August 22, 2001 || Socorro || LINEAR || ALA || align=right | 9.4 km || 
|-id=814 bgcolor=#d6d6d6
| 77814 ||  || — || August 20, 2001 || Palomar || NEAT || 7:4 || align=right | 7.7 km || 
|-id=815 bgcolor=#d6d6d6
| 77815 ||  || — || August 23, 2001 || Anderson Mesa || LONEOS || 7:4 || align=right | 7.5 km || 
|-id=816 bgcolor=#d6d6d6
| 77816 ||  || — || August 23, 2001 || Anderson Mesa || LONEOS || EOS || align=right | 5.4 km || 
|-id=817 bgcolor=#d6d6d6
| 77817 ||  || — || August 22, 2001 || Haleakala || NEAT || — || align=right | 7.8 km || 
|-id=818 bgcolor=#d6d6d6
| 77818 ||  || — || August 24, 2001 || Haleakala || NEAT || URS || align=right | 10 km || 
|-id=819 bgcolor=#d6d6d6
| 77819 ||  || — || August 25, 2001 || Haleakala || NEAT || — || align=right | 6.7 km || 
|-id=820 bgcolor=#d6d6d6
| 77820 ||  || — || August 27, 2001 || Socorro || LINEAR || 3:2 || align=right | 9.2 km || 
|-id=821 bgcolor=#d6d6d6
| 77821 ||  || — || August 26, 2001 || Haleakala || NEAT || EOS || align=right | 6.1 km || 
|-id=822 bgcolor=#d6d6d6
| 77822 ||  || — || August 21, 2001 || Kitt Peak || Spacewatch || HYG || align=right | 5.2 km || 
|-id=823 bgcolor=#d6d6d6
| 77823 ||  || — || August 21, 2001 || Socorro || LINEAR || ALA || align=right | 10 km || 
|-id=824 bgcolor=#d6d6d6
| 77824 ||  || — || August 21, 2001 || Socorro || LINEAR || — || align=right | 8.1 km || 
|-id=825 bgcolor=#d6d6d6
| 77825 ||  || — || August 22, 2001 || Socorro || LINEAR || EMA || align=right | 9.4 km || 
|-id=826 bgcolor=#d6d6d6
| 77826 ||  || — || August 23, 2001 || Anderson Mesa || LONEOS || EOS || align=right | 3.7 km || 
|-id=827 bgcolor=#d6d6d6
| 77827 ||  || — || August 23, 2001 || Anderson Mesa || LONEOS || — || align=right | 9.2 km || 
|-id=828 bgcolor=#d6d6d6
| 77828 ||  || — || August 23, 2001 || Anderson Mesa || LONEOS || TIR || align=right | 4.9 km || 
|-id=829 bgcolor=#d6d6d6
| 77829 ||  || — || August 23, 2001 || Anderson Mesa || LONEOS || THM || align=right | 7.1 km || 
|-id=830 bgcolor=#d6d6d6
| 77830 ||  || — || August 24, 2001 || Anderson Mesa || LONEOS || — || align=right | 4.0 km || 
|-id=831 bgcolor=#d6d6d6
| 77831 ||  || — || August 24, 2001 || Anderson Mesa || LONEOS || — || align=right | 8.2 km || 
|-id=832 bgcolor=#d6d6d6
| 77832 ||  || — || August 24, 2001 || Anderson Mesa || LONEOS || — || align=right | 6.8 km || 
|-id=833 bgcolor=#d6d6d6
| 77833 ||  || — || August 24, 2001 || Anderson Mesa || LONEOS || — || align=right | 6.2 km || 
|-id=834 bgcolor=#d6d6d6
| 77834 ||  || — || August 24, 2001 || Haleakala || NEAT || — || align=right | 6.8 km || 
|-id=835 bgcolor=#d6d6d6
| 77835 ||  || — || August 25, 2001 || Socorro || LINEAR || — || align=right | 5.1 km || 
|-id=836 bgcolor=#E9E9E9
| 77836 ||  || — || August 25, 2001 || Socorro || LINEAR || — || align=right | 7.0 km || 
|-id=837 bgcolor=#d6d6d6
| 77837 ||  || — || August 20, 2001 || Socorro || LINEAR || 7:4 || align=right | 12 km || 
|-id=838 bgcolor=#d6d6d6
| 77838 ||  || — || August 20, 2001 || Palomar || NEAT || ALA || align=right | 11 km || 
|-id=839 bgcolor=#d6d6d6
| 77839 ||  || — || August 20, 2001 || Palomar || NEAT || — || align=right | 4.5 km || 
|-id=840 bgcolor=#d6d6d6
| 77840 ||  || — || August 19, 2001 || Socorro || LINEAR || — || align=right | 6.6 km || 
|-id=841 bgcolor=#d6d6d6
| 77841 ||  || — || August 19, 2001 || Socorro || LINEAR || — || align=right | 7.2 km || 
|-id=842 bgcolor=#d6d6d6
| 77842 ||  || — || August 19, 2001 || Socorro || LINEAR || EOS || align=right | 5.3 km || 
|-id=843 bgcolor=#d6d6d6
| 77843 ||  || — || August 19, 2001 || Socorro || LINEAR || — || align=right | 8.0 km || 
|-id=844 bgcolor=#d6d6d6
| 77844 ||  || — || August 19, 2001 || Socorro || LINEAR || — || align=right | 7.8 km || 
|-id=845 bgcolor=#d6d6d6
| 77845 ||  || — || August 19, 2001 || Socorro || LINEAR || EOS || align=right | 6.2 km || 
|-id=846 bgcolor=#d6d6d6
| 77846 ||  || — || August 18, 2001 || Palomar || NEAT || — || align=right | 9.0 km || 
|-id=847 bgcolor=#d6d6d6
| 77847 ||  || — || August 17, 2001 || Socorro || LINEAR || HYG || align=right | 6.8 km || 
|-id=848 bgcolor=#d6d6d6
| 77848 ||  || — || August 16, 2001 || Socorro || LINEAR || HYG || align=right | 6.5 km || 
|-id=849 bgcolor=#d6d6d6
| 77849 ||  || — || September 8, 2001 || Socorro || LINEAR || — || align=right | 5.7 km || 
|-id=850 bgcolor=#d6d6d6
| 77850 ||  || — || September 7, 2001 || Socorro || LINEAR || HYG || align=right | 7.1 km || 
|-id=851 bgcolor=#d6d6d6
| 77851 ||  || — || September 8, 2001 || Socorro || LINEAR || — || align=right | 8.0 km || 
|-id=852 bgcolor=#d6d6d6
| 77852 ||  || — || September 8, 2001 || Socorro || LINEAR || — || align=right | 6.2 km || 
|-id=853 bgcolor=#d6d6d6
| 77853 ||  || — || September 8, 2001 || Socorro || LINEAR || — || align=right | 4.1 km || 
|-id=854 bgcolor=#d6d6d6
| 77854 ||  || — || September 8, 2001 || Socorro || LINEAR || — || align=right | 4.6 km || 
|-id=855 bgcolor=#d6d6d6
| 77855 ||  || — || September 10, 2001 || Socorro || LINEAR || MEL || align=right | 7.8 km || 
|-id=856 bgcolor=#E9E9E9
| 77856 Noblitt ||  ||  || September 11, 2001 || Oakley || C. Wolfe || — || align=right | 4.0 km || 
|-id=857 bgcolor=#E9E9E9
| 77857 ||  || — || September 10, 2001 || Socorro || LINEAR || — || align=right | 5.1 km || 
|-id=858 bgcolor=#d6d6d6
| 77858 ||  || — || September 12, 2001 || Socorro || LINEAR || — || align=right | 5.0 km || 
|-id=859 bgcolor=#d6d6d6
| 77859 ||  || — || September 12, 2001 || Socorro || LINEAR || — || align=right | 4.7 km || 
|-id=860 bgcolor=#C2FFFF
| 77860 ||  || — || September 12, 2001 || Socorro || LINEAR || L5 || align=right | 15 km || 
|-id=861 bgcolor=#d6d6d6
| 77861 ||  || — || September 12, 2001 || Socorro || LINEAR || — || align=right | 4.5 km || 
|-id=862 bgcolor=#d6d6d6
| 77862 ||  || — || September 15, 2001 || Palomar || NEAT || — || align=right | 5.5 km || 
|-id=863 bgcolor=#d6d6d6
| 77863 ||  || — || September 7, 2001 || Goodricke-Pigott || R. A. Tucker || — || align=right | 4.1 km || 
|-id=864 bgcolor=#d6d6d6
| 77864 ||  || — || September 7, 2001 || Anderson Mesa || LONEOS || — || align=right | 8.5 km || 
|-id=865 bgcolor=#d6d6d6
| 77865 ||  || — || September 8, 2001 || Anderson Mesa || LONEOS || — || align=right | 12 km || 
|-id=866 bgcolor=#d6d6d6
| 77866 ||  || — || September 10, 2001 || Anderson Mesa || LONEOS || URS || align=right | 5.6 km || 
|-id=867 bgcolor=#d6d6d6
| 77867 ||  || — || September 14, 2001 || Palomar || NEAT || — || align=right | 10 km || 
|-id=868 bgcolor=#d6d6d6
| 77868 ||  || — || September 12, 2001 || Socorro || LINEAR || — || align=right | 4.7 km || 
|-id=869 bgcolor=#d6d6d6
| 77869 || 2001 SA || — || September 16, 2001 || Prescott || P. G. Comba || — || align=right | 6.5 km || 
|-id=870 bgcolor=#d6d6d6
| 77870 MOTESS || 2001 SM ||  || September 16, 2001 || Fountain Hills || C. W. Juels, P. R. Holvorcem || FIR || align=right | 15 km || 
|-id=871 bgcolor=#d6d6d6
| 77871 ||  || — || September 19, 2001 || Fountain Hills || C. W. Juels, P. R. Holvorcem || — || align=right | 5.3 km || 
|-id=872 bgcolor=#d6d6d6
| 77872 ||  || — || September 16, 2001 || Socorro || LINEAR || — || align=right | 4.3 km || 
|-id=873 bgcolor=#d6d6d6
| 77873 ||  || — || September 16, 2001 || Socorro || LINEAR || — || align=right | 6.6 km || 
|-id=874 bgcolor=#d6d6d6
| 77874 ||  || — || September 16, 2001 || Socorro || LINEAR || — || align=right | 6.9 km || 
|-id=875 bgcolor=#E9E9E9
| 77875 ||  || — || September 16, 2001 || Socorro || LINEAR || ADE || align=right | 6.0 km || 
|-id=876 bgcolor=#E9E9E9
| 77876 ||  || — || September 16, 2001 || Socorro || LINEAR || — || align=right | 6.2 km || 
|-id=877 bgcolor=#d6d6d6
| 77877 ||  || — || September 17, 2001 || Socorro || LINEAR || — || align=right | 6.6 km || 
|-id=878 bgcolor=#d6d6d6
| 77878 ||  || — || September 17, 2001 || Socorro || LINEAR || URS || align=right | 16 km || 
|-id=879 bgcolor=#d6d6d6
| 77879 ||  || — || September 20, 2001 || Socorro || LINEAR || — || align=right | 4.8 km || 
|-id=880 bgcolor=#E9E9E9
| 77880 ||  || — || September 16, 2001 || Socorro || LINEAR || — || align=right | 6.6 km || 
|-id=881 bgcolor=#E9E9E9
| 77881 ||  || — || September 16, 2001 || Socorro || LINEAR || — || align=right | 4.5 km || 
|-id=882 bgcolor=#d6d6d6
| 77882 ||  || — || September 16, 2001 || Socorro || LINEAR || — || align=right | 7.8 km || 
|-id=883 bgcolor=#d6d6d6
| 77883 ||  || — || September 16, 2001 || Socorro || LINEAR || — || align=right | 5.4 km || 
|-id=884 bgcolor=#d6d6d6
| 77884 ||  || — || September 16, 2001 || Socorro || LINEAR || HIL3:2 || align=right | 17 km || 
|-id=885 bgcolor=#d6d6d6
| 77885 ||  || — || September 16, 2001 || Socorro || LINEAR || — || align=right | 6.9 km || 
|-id=886 bgcolor=#d6d6d6
| 77886 ||  || — || September 22, 2001 || Farpoint || G. Hug || URS || align=right | 4.9 km || 
|-id=887 bgcolor=#d6d6d6
| 77887 ||  || — || September 16, 2001 || Socorro || LINEAR || — || align=right | 5.6 km || 
|-id=888 bgcolor=#d6d6d6
| 77888 ||  || — || September 19, 2001 || Socorro || LINEAR || HYG || align=right | 7.0 km || 
|-id=889 bgcolor=#d6d6d6
| 77889 ||  || — || September 19, 2001 || Socorro || LINEAR || — || align=right | 3.5 km || 
|-id=890 bgcolor=#d6d6d6
| 77890 ||  || — || September 19, 2001 || Socorro || LINEAR || — || align=right | 4.7 km || 
|-id=891 bgcolor=#C2FFFF
| 77891 ||  || — || September 19, 2001 || Socorro || LINEAR || L5 || align=right | 16 km || 
|-id=892 bgcolor=#d6d6d6
| 77892 ||  || — || September 19, 2001 || Socorro || LINEAR || SHU3:2 || align=right | 13 km || 
|-id=893 bgcolor=#d6d6d6
| 77893 ||  || — || September 19, 2001 || Socorro || LINEAR || 3:2 || align=right | 6.8 km || 
|-id=894 bgcolor=#C2FFFF
| 77894 ||  || — || September 24, 2001 || Socorro || LINEAR || L5ENM || align=right | 20 km || 
|-id=895 bgcolor=#d6d6d6
| 77895 ||  || — || September 16, 2001 || Palomar || NEAT || HIL3:2 || align=right | 18 km || 
|-id=896 bgcolor=#d6d6d6
| 77896 ||  || — || October 10, 2001 || Palomar || NEAT || EOS || align=right | 4.7 km || 
|-id=897 bgcolor=#C2FFFF
| 77897 ||  || — || October 13, 2001 || Socorro || LINEAR || L5 || align=right | 19 km || 
|-id=898 bgcolor=#d6d6d6
| 77898 ||  || — || October 14, 2001 || Socorro || LINEAR || — || align=right | 9.3 km || 
|-id=899 bgcolor=#d6d6d6
| 77899 ||  || — || October 15, 2001 || Socorro || LINEAR || Tj (2.95) || align=right | 7.1 km || 
|-id=900 bgcolor=#d6d6d6
| 77900 ||  || — || October 10, 2001 || Palomar || NEAT || 7:4 || align=right | 4.2 km || 
|}

77901–78000 

|-bgcolor=#d6d6d6
| 77901 ||  || — || October 10, 2001 || Palomar || NEAT || EOS || align=right | 6.3 km || 
|-id=902 bgcolor=#C2FFFF
| 77902 ||  || — || October 10, 2001 || Palomar || NEAT || L5 || align=right | 17 km || 
|-id=903 bgcolor=#d6d6d6
| 77903 ||  || — || October 10, 2001 || Palomar || NEAT || 3:2 || align=right | 12 km || 
|-id=904 bgcolor=#d6d6d6
| 77904 ||  || — || October 10, 2001 || Palomar || NEAT || — || align=right | 6.0 km || 
|-id=905 bgcolor=#d6d6d6
| 77905 ||  || — || October 10, 2001 || Palomar || NEAT || 3:2 || align=right | 12 km || 
|-id=906 bgcolor=#C2FFFF
| 77906 ||  || — || October 11, 2001 || Palomar || NEAT || L5 || align=right | 16 km || 
|-id=907 bgcolor=#d6d6d6
| 77907 ||  || — || October 11, 2001 || Socorro || LINEAR || TIR || align=right | 6.0 km || 
|-id=908 bgcolor=#E9E9E9
| 77908 ||  || — || October 11, 2001 || Socorro || LINEAR || — || align=right | 3.8 km || 
|-id=909 bgcolor=#d6d6d6
| 77909 ||  || — || October 13, 2001 || Palomar || NEAT || — || align=right | 11 km || 
|-id=910 bgcolor=#d6d6d6
| 77910 ||  || — || October 15, 2001 || Palomar || NEAT || HIL3:2 || align=right | 13 km || 
|-id=911 bgcolor=#d6d6d6
| 77911 ||  || — || October 15, 2001 || Palomar || NEAT || 7:4* || align=right | 11 km || 
|-id=912 bgcolor=#d6d6d6
| 77912 ||  || — || October 15, 2001 || Palomar || NEAT || — || align=right | 7.9 km || 
|-id=913 bgcolor=#d6d6d6
| 77913 ||  || — || October 18, 2001 || Socorro || LINEAR || LIX || align=right | 9.9 km || 
|-id=914 bgcolor=#C2FFFF
| 77914 ||  || — || October 17, 2001 || Socorro || LINEAR || L5 || align=right | 24 km || 
|-id=915 bgcolor=#E9E9E9
| 77915 ||  || — || November 9, 2001 || Socorro || LINEAR || — || align=right | 3.7 km || 
|-id=916 bgcolor=#C2FFFF
| 77916 ||  || — || November 19, 2001 || Socorro || LINEAR || L5 || align=right | 14 km || 
|-id=917 bgcolor=#fefefe
| 77917 ||  || — || January 23, 2002 || Socorro || LINEAR || H || align=right | 1.2 km || 
|-id=918 bgcolor=#fefefe
| 77918 ||  || — || January 25, 2002 || Socorro || LINEAR || H || align=right | 1.6 km || 
|-id=919 bgcolor=#fefefe
| 77919 ||  || — || February 11, 2002 || Socorro || LINEAR || — || align=right | 1.8 km || 
|-id=920 bgcolor=#fefefe
| 77920 ||  || — || March 13, 2002 || Socorro || LINEAR || — || align=right | 1.7 km || 
|-id=921 bgcolor=#fefefe
| 77921 ||  || — || March 15, 2002 || Ametlla de Mar || J. Nomen || FLO || align=right | 1.4 km || 
|-id=922 bgcolor=#fefefe
| 77922 ||  || — || March 13, 2002 || Socorro || LINEAR || NYS || align=right | 1.3 km || 
|-id=923 bgcolor=#fefefe
| 77923 ||  || — || March 13, 2002 || Socorro || LINEAR || NYS || align=right | 1.7 km || 
|-id=924 bgcolor=#fefefe
| 77924 ||  || — || March 9, 2002 || Socorro || LINEAR || — || align=right | 1.3 km || 
|-id=925 bgcolor=#fefefe
| 77925 ||  || — || March 13, 2002 || Socorro || LINEAR || H || align=right | 1.2 km || 
|-id=926 bgcolor=#E9E9E9
| 77926 ||  || — || March 12, 2002 || Palomar || NEAT || — || align=right | 2.0 km || 
|-id=927 bgcolor=#fefefe
| 77927 ||  || — || March 21, 2002 || Socorro || LINEAR || H || align=right | 1.6 km || 
|-id=928 bgcolor=#fefefe
| 77928 ||  || — || April 6, 2002 || Socorro || LINEAR || — || align=right | 1.6 km || 
|-id=929 bgcolor=#fefefe
| 77929 ||  || — || April 14, 2002 || Desert Eagle || W. K. Y. Yeung || V || align=right | 1.5 km || 
|-id=930 bgcolor=#d6d6d6
| 77930 ||  || — || April 8, 2002 || Bergisch Gladbach || W. Bickel || AEG || align=right | 7.1 km || 
|-id=931 bgcolor=#fefefe
| 77931 ||  || — || April 14, 2002 || Socorro || LINEAR || — || align=right | 1.5 km || 
|-id=932 bgcolor=#fefefe
| 77932 ||  || — || April 14, 2002 || Socorro || LINEAR || — || align=right | 1.6 km || 
|-id=933 bgcolor=#E9E9E9
| 77933 ||  || — || April 14, 2002 || Socorro || LINEAR || — || align=right | 6.0 km || 
|-id=934 bgcolor=#fefefe
| 77934 ||  || — || April 14, 2002 || Haleakala || NEAT || FLO || align=right | 1.3 km || 
|-id=935 bgcolor=#fefefe
| 77935 ||  || — || April 5, 2002 || Palomar || NEAT || FLO || align=right | 1.7 km || 
|-id=936 bgcolor=#E9E9E9
| 77936 ||  || — || April 8, 2002 || Palomar || NEAT || — || align=right | 6.9 km || 
|-id=937 bgcolor=#fefefe
| 77937 ||  || — || April 8, 2002 || Palomar || NEAT || — || align=right | 1.5 km || 
|-id=938 bgcolor=#fefefe
| 77938 ||  || — || April 10, 2002 || Socorro || LINEAR || FLO || align=right | 2.6 km || 
|-id=939 bgcolor=#fefefe
| 77939 ||  || — || April 10, 2002 || Socorro || LINEAR || FLO || align=right | 1.4 km || 
|-id=940 bgcolor=#fefefe
| 77940 ||  || — || April 10, 2002 || Socorro || LINEAR || FLO || align=right | 1.5 km || 
|-id=941 bgcolor=#E9E9E9
| 77941 ||  || — || April 10, 2002 || Palomar || NEAT || — || align=right | 3.7 km || 
|-id=942 bgcolor=#fefefe
| 77942 ||  || — || April 8, 2002 || Palomar || NEAT || NYS || align=right | 1.3 km || 
|-id=943 bgcolor=#fefefe
| 77943 ||  || — || April 9, 2002 || Socorro || LINEAR || — || align=right | 1.5 km || 
|-id=944 bgcolor=#fefefe
| 77944 ||  || — || April 9, 2002 || Socorro || LINEAR || FLO || align=right | 1.2 km || 
|-id=945 bgcolor=#fefefe
| 77945 ||  || — || April 9, 2002 || Socorro || LINEAR || — || align=right | 1.3 km || 
|-id=946 bgcolor=#fefefe
| 77946 ||  || — || April 10, 2002 || Socorro || LINEAR || — || align=right | 1.6 km || 
|-id=947 bgcolor=#fefefe
| 77947 ||  || — || April 10, 2002 || Socorro || LINEAR || — || align=right | 1.7 km || 
|-id=948 bgcolor=#fefefe
| 77948 ||  || — || April 11, 2002 || Socorro || LINEAR || V || align=right | 1.6 km || 
|-id=949 bgcolor=#fefefe
| 77949 ||  || — || April 12, 2002 || Socorro || LINEAR || — || align=right | 1.9 km || 
|-id=950 bgcolor=#fefefe
| 77950 ||  || — || April 12, 2002 || Socorro || LINEAR || V || align=right | 1.2 km || 
|-id=951 bgcolor=#fefefe
| 77951 ||  || — || April 13, 2002 || Palomar || NEAT || — || align=right | 1.4 km || 
|-id=952 bgcolor=#fefefe
| 77952 ||  || — || April 13, 2002 || Palomar || NEAT || FLO || align=right | 1.5 km || 
|-id=953 bgcolor=#fefefe
| 77953 ||  || — || April 13, 2002 || Palomar || NEAT || — || align=right | 1.8 km || 
|-id=954 bgcolor=#fefefe
| 77954 ||  || — || April 4, 2002 || Kitt Peak || Spacewatch || — || align=right | 1.9 km || 
|-id=955 bgcolor=#E9E9E9
| 77955 ||  || — || April 16, 2002 || Socorro || LINEAR || — || align=right | 3.6 km || 
|-id=956 bgcolor=#d6d6d6
| 77956 ||  || — || April 21, 2002 || Kitt Peak || Spacewatch || — || align=right | 7.1 km || 
|-id=957 bgcolor=#fefefe
| 77957 ||  || — || April 16, 2002 || Socorro || LINEAR || — || align=right | 1.6 km || 
|-id=958 bgcolor=#fefefe
| 77958 ||  || — || April 21, 2002 || Tebbutt || F. B. Zoltowski || MAS || align=right | 1.7 km || 
|-id=959 bgcolor=#fefefe
| 77959 ||  || — || April 29, 2002 || Palomar || NEAT || FLO || align=right | 1.3 km || 
|-id=960 bgcolor=#fefefe
| 77960 ||  || — || April 22, 2002 || Socorro || LINEAR || H || align=right | 1.4 km || 
|-id=961 bgcolor=#fefefe
| 77961 ||  || — || April 22, 2002 || Socorro || LINEAR || H || align=right | 2.0 km || 
|-id=962 bgcolor=#E9E9E9
| 77962 ||  || — || May 3, 2002 || Desert Eagle || W. K. Y. Yeung || — || align=right | 6.6 km || 
|-id=963 bgcolor=#fefefe
| 77963 ||  || — || May 4, 2002 || Desert Eagle || W. K. Y. Yeung || EUT || align=right | 1.3 km || 
|-id=964 bgcolor=#fefefe
| 77964 ||  || — || May 4, 2002 || Desert Eagle || W. K. Y. Yeung || FLO || align=right | 1.8 km || 
|-id=965 bgcolor=#fefefe
| 77965 ||  || — || May 1, 2002 || Palomar || NEAT || NYS || align=right | 1.1 km || 
|-id=966 bgcolor=#fefefe
| 77966 ||  || — || May 5, 2002 || Desert Eagle || W. K. Y. Yeung || — || align=right | 1.4 km || 
|-id=967 bgcolor=#fefefe
| 77967 ||  || — || May 5, 2002 || Desert Eagle || W. K. Y. Yeung || MAS || align=right | 1.2 km || 
|-id=968 bgcolor=#fefefe
| 77968 ||  || — || May 4, 2002 || Palomar || NEAT || — || align=right | 2.0 km || 
|-id=969 bgcolor=#E9E9E9
| 77969 ||  || — || May 6, 2002 || Palomar || NEAT || — || align=right | 1.9 km || 
|-id=970 bgcolor=#fefefe
| 77970 ||  || — || May 6, 2002 || Socorro || LINEAR || H || align=right | 1.5 km || 
|-id=971 bgcolor=#FA8072
| 77971 Donnolo ||  ||  || May 7, 2002 || Nogales || Tenagra II Obs. || PHO || align=right | 2.5 km || 
|-id=972 bgcolor=#fefefe
| 77972 ||  || — || May 2, 2002 || Anderson Mesa || LONEOS || — || align=right | 2.0 km || 
|-id=973 bgcolor=#fefefe
| 77973 ||  || — || May 6, 2002 || Anderson Mesa || LONEOS || — || align=right | 1.5 km || 
|-id=974 bgcolor=#fefefe
| 77974 ||  || — || May 8, 2002 || Desert Eagle || W. K. Y. Yeung || H || align=right | 1.1 km || 
|-id=975 bgcolor=#fefefe
| 77975 ||  || — || May 7, 2002 || Palomar || NEAT || FLO || align=right | 1.4 km || 
|-id=976 bgcolor=#fefefe
| 77976 ||  || — || May 7, 2002 || Palomar || NEAT || — || align=right | 1.6 km || 
|-id=977 bgcolor=#fefefe
| 77977 ||  || — || May 8, 2002 || Haleakala || NEAT || — || align=right | 1.7 km || 
|-id=978 bgcolor=#fefefe
| 77978 ||  || — || May 8, 2002 || Haleakala || NEAT || — || align=right | 1.8 km || 
|-id=979 bgcolor=#fefefe
| 77979 ||  || — || May 9, 2002 || Desert Eagle || W. K. Y. Yeung || — || align=right | 1.4 km || 
|-id=980 bgcolor=#fefefe
| 77980 ||  || — || May 8, 2002 || Socorro || LINEAR || FLO || align=right | 1.6 km || 
|-id=981 bgcolor=#E9E9E9
| 77981 ||  || — || May 8, 2002 || Socorro || LINEAR || — || align=right | 4.8 km || 
|-id=982 bgcolor=#E9E9E9
| 77982 ||  || — || May 8, 2002 || Socorro || LINEAR || — || align=right | 2.1 km || 
|-id=983 bgcolor=#fefefe
| 77983 ||  || — || May 9, 2002 || Socorro || LINEAR || — || align=right | 1.5 km || 
|-id=984 bgcolor=#fefefe
| 77984 ||  || — || May 9, 2002 || Socorro || LINEAR || V || align=right | 1.4 km || 
|-id=985 bgcolor=#fefefe
| 77985 ||  || — || May 9, 2002 || Socorro || LINEAR || FLO || align=right | 1.6 km || 
|-id=986 bgcolor=#E9E9E9
| 77986 ||  || — || May 9, 2002 || Socorro || LINEAR || — || align=right | 2.5 km || 
|-id=987 bgcolor=#fefefe
| 77987 ||  || — || May 9, 2002 || Socorro || LINEAR || — || align=right | 1.7 km || 
|-id=988 bgcolor=#fefefe
| 77988 ||  || — || May 9, 2002 || Socorro || LINEAR || NYS || align=right | 1.6 km || 
|-id=989 bgcolor=#fefefe
| 77989 ||  || — || May 9, 2002 || Socorro || LINEAR || — || align=right | 1.9 km || 
|-id=990 bgcolor=#E9E9E9
| 77990 ||  || — || May 9, 2002 || Socorro || LINEAR || — || align=right | 3.9 km || 
|-id=991 bgcolor=#fefefe
| 77991 ||  || — || May 9, 2002 || Socorro || LINEAR || — || align=right | 1.9 km || 
|-id=992 bgcolor=#fefefe
| 77992 ||  || — || May 9, 2002 || Socorro || LINEAR || V || align=right | 1.5 km || 
|-id=993 bgcolor=#fefefe
| 77993 ||  || — || May 9, 2002 || Socorro || LINEAR || V || align=right | 1.4 km || 
|-id=994 bgcolor=#fefefe
| 77994 ||  || — || May 10, 2002 || Desert Eagle || W. K. Y. Yeung || V || align=right | 1.4 km || 
|-id=995 bgcolor=#E9E9E9
| 77995 ||  || — || May 8, 2002 || Socorro || LINEAR || — || align=right | 2.1 km || 
|-id=996 bgcolor=#fefefe
| 77996 ||  || — || May 8, 2002 || Socorro || LINEAR || NYS || align=right | 3.2 km || 
|-id=997 bgcolor=#fefefe
| 77997 ||  || — || May 9, 2002 || Socorro || LINEAR || H || align=right | 1.2 km || 
|-id=998 bgcolor=#fefefe
| 77998 ||  || — || May 9, 2002 || Socorro || LINEAR || — || align=right | 1.9 km || 
|-id=999 bgcolor=#fefefe
| 77999 ||  || — || May 9, 2002 || Socorro || LINEAR || V || align=right | 1.7 km || 
|-id=000 bgcolor=#E9E9E9
| 78000 ||  || — || May 9, 2002 || Socorro || LINEAR || — || align=right | 1.9 km || 
|}

References

External links 
 Discovery Circumstances: Numbered Minor Planets (75001)–(80000) (IAU Minor Planet Center)

0077